= List of Wuhan Metro stations =

Map of the Wuhan Metro

Wuhan Metro is a rapid transit system serving the city of Wuhan, China. The network now includes 13 lines, 351 stations, and 581 km (361 mi) of route length as of October 29, 2026.

The following is the lists of Wuhan Metro stations in operation sorted by lines.

== System map ==
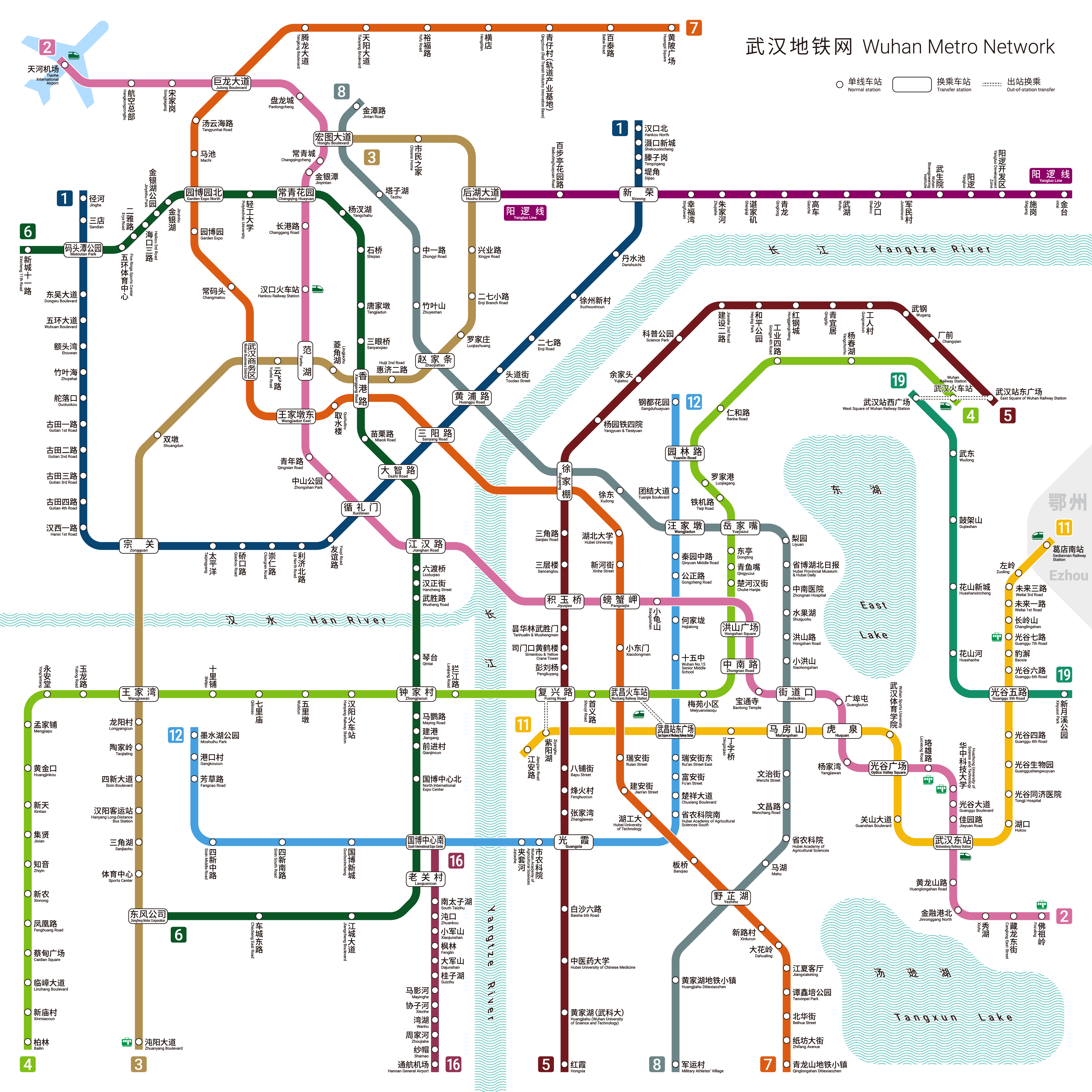

== Line 1 ==
Line 1
| Station name (Chinese) | Station name (English) | Interstation distance (km) | Distance from origin (km) | District | Transfers | Layout | Opened |
| 径河 | Jinghe | — | 0 | Dongxihu | | Elevated | 2017-12-26 |
| 三店 | Sandian | 1.110 | 1.110 | Dongxihu | | Elevated | 2017-12-26 |
| 码头潭公园 | Matoutan Park | 1.971 | 3.081 | Dongxihu | Line 6 | Elevated | 2017-12-26 |
| 东吴大道 | Dongwu Boulevard | 1.037 | 4.118 | Dongxihu | | Elevated | 2010-07-29 |
| 五环大道 | Wuhuan Boulevard | 1.652 | 5.770 | Dongxihu | | Elevated | 2010-07-29 |
| 额头湾 | Etouwan | 1.655 | 7.425 | Qiaokou | | Elevated | 2010-07-29 |
| 竹叶海 | Zhuyehai | 0.944 | 8.369 | Qiaokou | | Elevated | 2014-09-17 |
| 舵落口 | Duoluokou | 0.807 | 9.176 | Qiaokou | | Elevated | 2010-07-29 |
| 古田一路 | Gutian 1st Road | 1.435 | 10.611 | Qiaokou | | Elevated | 2010-07-29 |
| 古田二路 | Gutian 2nd Road | 1.518 | 12.129 | Qiaokou | | Elevated | 2010-07-29 |
| 古田三路 | Gutian 3rd Road | 0.907 | 13.036 | Qiaokou | | Elevated | 2010-07-29 |
| 古田四路 | Gutian 4th Road | 0.795 | 13.831 | Qiaokou | | Elevated | 2010-07-29 |
| 汉西一路 | Hanxi 1st Road | 0.820 | 14.651 | Qiaokou | | Elevated | 2010-07-29 |
| 宗关 | Zongguan | 0.921 | 15.572 | Qiaokou | Line 3 | Elevated | 2004-07-28 |
| 太平洋 | Taipingyang | 1.580 | 17.152 | Qiaokou | | Elevated | 2006-04-08 |
| 硚口路 | Qiaokou Road | 1.045 | 18.197 | Qiaokou | | Elevated | 2004-07-28 |
| 崇仁路 | Chongren Road | 1.142 | 19.339 | Qiaokou | | Elevated | 2004-07-28 |
| 利济北路 | Liji North Road | 0.880 | 20.219 | Jianghan/Qiaokou | | Elevated | 2004-07-28 |
| 友谊路 | Youyi Road | 0.888 | 21.107 | Jianghan | | Elevated | 2004-07-28 |
| 循礼门 | Xunlimen | 0.986 | 22.093 | Jiang'an | Line 2 | Elevated | 2004-07-28 |
| 大智路 | Dazhi Road | 1.083 | 23.176 | Jiang'an | Line 6 | Elevated | 2004-07-28 |
| 三阳路 | Sanyang Road | 1.010 | 24.186 | Jiang'an | Line 7 | Elevated | 2004-07-28 |
| 黄浦路 | Huangpu Road | 1.155 | 25.341 | Jiang'an | Line 8 | Elevated | 2004-07-28 |
| 头道街 | Toudao Street | 1.203 | 26.544 | Jiang'an | | Elevated | 2010-07-29 |
| 二七路 | Erqi Road | 0.915 | 27.459 | Jiang'an | | Elevated | 2010-07-29 |
| 徐州新村 | Xuzhouxincun | 0.795 | 28.254 | Jiang'an | | Elevated | 2010-07-29 |
| 丹水池 | Danshuichi | 1.525 | 29.779 | Jiang'an | | Elevated | 2010-07-29 |
| 新荣 | Xinrong | 1.437 | 31.216 | Jiang'an | Yangluo Line | Elevated | 2010-07-29 |
| 堤角 | Dijiao | 1.165 | 32.381 | Jiang'an | | Elevated | 2010-07-29 |
| 滕子岗 | Tengzigang | 1.025 | 33.406 | Jiang'an | | Elevated | 2014-05-28 |
| 滠口新城 | Shekouxincheng | 1.120 | 34.526 | Huangpi | | Elevated | 2014-05-28 |
| 汉口北 | Hankou North | 3.410 | 37.936 | Huangpi | | Elevated | 2014-05-28 |

== Line 2 ==
Line 2
| Station name (Chinese) | Station name (English) | Interstation distance (km) | Distance from origin (km) | District | Transfers | Layout | Opened |
| 天河机场 | Tianhe International Airport | — | 0 | Huangpi | | Underground | 2016-12-28 |
| 航空总部 | Hangkongzongbu | 6.004 | 6.004 | Huangpi | | Elevated | 2016-12-28 |
| 宋家岗 | Songjiagang | 1.427 | 7.431 | Huangpi | | Elevated | 2016-12-28 |
| 巨龙大道 | Julong Boulevard | 2.039 | 9.470 | Huangpi | Line 7 | Underground | 2016-12-28 |
| 盘龙城 | Panlongcheng | 1.643 | 11.113 | Huangpi | | Underground | 2016-12-28 |
| 宏图大道 | Hongtu Boulevard | 3.946 | 15.059 | Dongxihu | Line 3 Line 8 | Underground | 2016-12-28 |
| 常青城 | Changqingcheng | 2.886 | 17.945 | Dongxihu | | Underground | 2016-12-28 |
| 金银潭 | Jinyintan | 2.012 | 19.957 | Dongxihu | | Underground | 2012-12-28 |
| 常青花园 | Changqing Huayuan | 1.092 | 21.049 | Dongxihu | Line 6 | Underground | 2012-12-28 |
| 长港路 | Changgang Road | 1.725 | 22.774 | Jianghan | | Underground | 2012-12-28 |
| 汉口火车站 | Hankou Railway Station | 1.407 | 24.181 | Jianghan | Line 10 | Underground | 2012-12-28 |
| 范湖 | Fanhu | 1.216 | 25.397 | Jianghan | Line 3 | Underground | 2012-12-28 |
| 王家墩东 | Wangjiadun East | 1.410 | 26.807 | Jianghan | Line 7 | Underground | 2012-12-28 |
| 青年路 | Qingnian Road | 1.002 | 27.809 | Jianghan | | Underground | 2012-12-28 |
| 中山公园 | Zhongshan Park | 0.946 | 28.755 | Jianghan | | Underground | 2012-12-28 |
| 循礼門 | Xunlimen | 1.543 | 30.298 | Jiang'an/Jianghan | Line 1 | Underground | 2012-12-28 |
| 江汉路 | Jianghan Road | 0.897 | 31.195 | Jianghan | Line 6 | Underground | 2012-12-28 |
| 积玉桥 | Jiyuqiao | 3.292 | 34.487 | Wuchang | Line 5 | Underground | 2012-12-28 |
| 螃蟹岬 | Pangxiejia | 1.579 | 36.066 | Wuchang | Line 7 | Underground | 2012-12-28 |
| 小龟山 | Xiaoguishan | 0.930 | 36.996 | Wuchang | | Underground | 2012-12-28 |
| 洪山广场 | Hongshan Square | 1.168 | 38.164 | Wuchang | Line 4 | Underground | 2012-12-28 |
| 中南路 | Zhongnan Road | 0.966 | 39.130 | Wuchang | Line 4 | Underground | 2012-12-28 |
| 宝通寺 | Baotong Temple | 1.418 | 40.548 | Wuchang | | Underground | 2012-12-28 |
| 街道口 | Jiedaokou | 1.238 | 41.786 | Hongshan | Line 8 | Underground | 2012-12-28 |
| 广埠屯 | Guangbutun | 0.951 | 42.737 | Hongshan | | Underground | 2012-12-28 |
| 虎泉 | Huquan | 1.613 | 44.350 | Hongshan | Line 11 | Underground | 2012-12-28 |
| 杨家湾 | Yangjiawan | 1.442 | 45.792 | Hongshan | | Underground | 2012-12-28 |
| 光谷广场 | Optics Valley Square | 1.317 | 47.109 | Hongshan | Line 11 | Underground | 2012-12-28 |
| 珞雄路 | Luoxiong Road | 0.794 | 47.903 | Hongshan | | Underground | 2019-02-19 |
| 华中科技大学 | Huazhong University of Science and Technology | 1.009 | 48.912 | Hongshan | | Underground | 2019-02-19 |
| 光谷大道 | Guanggu Boulevard | 0.817 | 49.729 | Hongshan | | Underground | 2019-02-19 |
| 佳园路 | Jiayuan Road | 1.368 | 51.097 | Hongshan | | Underground | 2019-02-19 |
| 武汉东站 | Wuhandong Railway Station | 1.487 | 52.584 | Hongshan | Line 11 | Underground | 2019-02-19 |
| 黄龙山路 | Huanglongshan Road | 1.059 | 53.643 | Hongshan | | Underground | 2019-02-19 |
| 金融港北 | Jinronggang North | 2.038 | 55.681 | Hongshan/Jiangxia | | Underground | 2019-02-19 |
| 秀湖 | Xiuhu | 1.603 | 57.284 | Hongshan/Jiangxia | | Underground | 2019-02-19 |
| 藏龙东街 | Canglong East Street | 1.999 | 59.283 | Jiangxia | | Underground | 2019-02-19 |
| 佛祖岭 | Fozuling | 1.021 | 60.304 | Jiangxia | | Underground | 2019-02-19 |

== Line 3 ==
Line 3
| Station name (Chinese) | Station name (English) | Interstation distance (km) | Distance from origin (km) | District | Transfers | Layout | Opened |
| 沌阳大道 | Zhuanyang Boulevard | — | 0 | WETDZ (Note: full name: Wuhan Economic & Technological Development Zone) | Auto-city T1 Line (Note: a tram line, Out-of-station transfer) | Underground | 2015-12-28 |
| 东风公司 | Dongfeng Motor Corporation | 1.449 | 1.449 | WETDZ | Line 6 | Underground | 2015-12-28 |
| 体育中心 | Sports Center | 0.842 | 2.291 | WETDZ | | Underground | 2015-12-28 |
| 三角湖 | Sanjiaohu | 1.454 | 3.745 | WETDZ | | Underground | 2015-12-28 |
| 汉阳客运站 | Hanyang Long-Distance Bus Station | 1.563 | 5.308 | WETDZ | | Underground | 2015-12-28 |
| 四新大道 | Sixin Boulevard | 0.928 | 6.236 | Hanyang | | Underground | 2015-12-28 |
| 陶家岭 | Taojialing | 1.359 | 7.595 | Hanyang | | Underground | 2015-12-28 |
| 龙阳村 | Longyangcun | 0.906 | 8.501 | Hanyang | | Underground | 2015-12-28 |
| 王家湾 | Wangjiawan | 1.107 | 9.608 | Hanyang | Line 4 | Underground | 2015-12-28 |
| 宗关 | Zongguan | 2.531 | 12.139 | Qiaokou | Line 1 | Underground | 2015-12-28 |
| 双墩 | Shuangdun | 0.982 | 13.121 | Qiaokou | | Underground | 2015-12-28 |
| 武汉商务区 | Wuhan Business District | 1.825 | 14.946 | Jianghan | Line 7 | Underground | 2015-12-28 |
| 云飞路 | Yunfei Road | 1.227 | 16.173 | Jianghan | | Underground | 2015-12-28 |
| 范湖 | Fanhu | 0.885 | 17.058 | Jianghan | Line 2 | Underground | 2015-12-28 |
| 菱角湖 | Lingjiaohu | 1.676 | 18.734 | Jianghan | | Underground | 2015-12-28 |
| 香港路 | Xianggang Road | 0.932 | 19.666 | Jiang'an/Jianghan | Line 6 Line 7 | Underground | 2015-12-28 |
| 惠济二路 | Huiji 2nd Road | 0.934 | 20.600 | Jiang'an | | Underground | 2015-12-28 |
| 赵家条 | Zhaojiatiao | 0.896 | 21.496 | Jiang'an | Line 8 | Underground | 2015-12-28 |
| 罗家庄 | Luojiazhuang | 0.882 | 22.378 | Jiang'an | | Underground | 2015-12-28 |
| 二七小路 | Erqi Branch Road | 0.759 | 23.137 | Jiang'an | | Underground | 2015-12-28 |
| 兴业路 | Xingye Road | 1.253 | 24.390 | Jiang'an | | Underground | 2015-12-28 |
| 后湖大道 | Houhu Boulevard | 1.181 | 25.571 | Jiang'an | Yangluo Line | Underground | 2015-12-28 |
| 市民之家 | Citizens Home | 1.667 | 27.238 | Jiang'an | | Underground | 2015-12-28 |
| 宏图大道 | Hongtu Boulevard | 2.422 | 29.660 | Dongxihu | Line 2 Line 8 | Underground | 2015-12-28 |

== Line 4 ==
Line 4
| Station name (Chinese) | Station name (English) | Interstation distance (km) | Distance from origin (km) | District | Transfers | Layout | Opened |
| 柏林 | Bailin | — | 0 | Caidian | | Elevated | 2019-09-25 |
| 新庙村 | Xinmiaocun | 1.417 | 1.417 | Caidian | | Elevated | 2019-09-25 |
| 临嶂大道 | Linzhang Boulevard | 2.081 | 3.498 | Caidian | | Underground | 2019-09-25 |
| 蔡甸广场 | Caidian Square | 1.241 | 4.739 | Caidian | | Underground | 2019-09-25 |
| 凤凰路 | Fenghuang Road | 2.148 | 6.887 | Caidian | | Underground | 2019-09-25 |
| 新农 | Xinnong | 1.453 | 8.340 | Caidian | | Underground | 2019-09-25 |
| 知音 | Zhiyin | 1.820 | 10.160 | Caidian | | Underground | 2019-09-25 |
| 集贤 | Jixian | 2.011 | 12.171 | Caidian | | Underground | 2019-09-25 |
| 新天 | Xintian | 1.367 | 13.538 | Caidian | | Underground | 2019-09-25 |
| 黄金口 | Huangjinkou | 2.750 | 16.288 | Hanyang | | Elevated | 2014-12-28 |
| 孟家铺 | Mengjiapu | 2.762 | 19.050 | Hanyang | | Elevated | 2014-12-28 |
| 永安堂 | Yong'antang | 1.479 | 20.529 | Hanyang | | Underground | 2014-12-28 |
| 玉龙路 | Yulong Road | 1.243 | 21.772 | Hanyang | | Underground | 2014-12-28 |
| 王家湾 | Wangjiawan | 0.901 | 22.673 | Hanyang | Line 3 | Underground | 2014-12-28 |
| 十里铺 | Shilipu | 0.950 | 23.623 | Hanyang | Line 12 | Underground | 2014-12-28 |
| 七里庙 | Qilimiao | 1.204 | 24.827 | Hanyang | | Underground | 2014-12-28 |
| 五里墩 | Wulidun | 1.124 | 25.951 | Hanyang | Line 10 | Underground | 2014-12-28 |
| 汉阳火车站 | Hanyang Railway Station | 1.012 | 26.963 | Hanyang | | Underground | 2014-12-28 |
| 钟家村 | Zhongjiacun | 1.574 | 28.537 | Hanyang | Line 6 | Underground | 2014-12-28 |
| 拦江路 | Lanjiang Road | 0.834 | 29.371 | Hanyang | | Underground | 2014-12-28 |
| 复兴路 | Fuxing Road | 3.278 | 32.649 | Wuchang | Line 5 | Underground | 2014-12-28 |
| 首义路 | Shouyi Road | 0.718 | 33.367 | Wuchang | | Underground | 2014-12-28 |
| 武昌火车站 | Wuchang Railway Station | 0.897 | 34.264 | Wuchang | Line 7 | Underground | 2013-12-28 |
| 梅苑小区 | Meiyuanxiaoqu | 0.900 | 35.164 | Wuchang | | Underground | 2013-12-28 |
| 中南路 | Zhongnan Road | 1.095 | 36.259 | Wuchang | Line 2 | Underground | 2013-12-28 |
| 洪山广场 | Hongshan Square | 0.966 | 37.225 | Wuchang | Line 2 | Underground | 2013-12-28 |
| 楚河汉街 | Chuhe Hanjie | 1.077 | 38.302 | Wuchang | | Underground | 2013-12-28 |
| 青鱼嘴 | Qingyuzui | 1.226 | 39.528 | Wuchang | | Underground | 2013-12-28 |
| 东亭 | Dongting | 1.048 | 40.576 | Wuchang | | Underground | 2013-12-28 |
| 岳家嘴 | Yuejiazui | 0.928 | 41.504 | Hongshan | Line 8 | Underground | 2013-12-28 |
| 铁机路 | Tieji Road | 1.032 | 42.536 | Hongshan | | Underground | 2013-12-28 |
| 罗家港 | Luojiagang | 1.171 | 43.707 | Hongshan | | Underground | 2013-12-28 |
| 园林路 | Yuanlin Road | 1.036 | 44.743 | Hongshan | Line 12 | Underground | 2013-12-28 |
| 仁和路 | Renhe Road | 1.333 | 46.076 | Hongshan | | Underground | 2013-12-28 |
| 工业四路 | Gongye 4th Road | 1.634 | 47.710 | Hongshan | | Underground | 2013-12-28 |
| 杨春湖 | Yangchunhu | 1.173 | 48.883 | Hongshan | | Underground | 2013-12-28 |
| 武汉火车站 | Wuhan Railway Station | 0.810 | 49.693 | Hongshan | Line 5 (Note: Out-of-station transfer) Line 19 (Note: Out-of-station transfer) | Underground | 2013-12-28 |

== Line 5 ==
Line 5
| Station name (Chinese) | Station name (English) | Interstation distance (km) | Distance from origin (km) | District | Transfers | Layout | Opened |
| 红霞 | Hongxia | — | 0 | Hongshan | | Elevated | 2023-12-01 |
| 黄家湖（武科大） | Huangjiahu (Wuhan Univ. of Science and Technology) | 1.353 | 1.353 | Hongshan | | Elevated | 2023-12-01 |
| 中医药大学 | Hubei Univ. of Chinese Medicine | 1.302 | 2.655 | Hongshan | | Elevated | 2021-12-26 |
| 白沙六路 | Baisha 6th Road | 3.732 | 6.387 | Hongshan | | Elevated | 2021-12-26 |
| 光霞 | Guangxia | 1.103 | 7.490 | Hongshan | | Elevated | 2021-12-26 |
| 张家湾 | Zhangjiawan | 1.868 | 9.358 | Hongshan | | Elevated | 2021-12-26 |
| 烽火村 | Fenghuocun | 1.603 | 10.961 | Hongshan | | Underground | 2021-12-26 |
| 八铺街 | Bapu Street | 1.307 | 12.268 | Wuchang | | Underground | 2021-12-26 |
| 复兴路 | Fuxing Road | 1.510 | 13.778 | Wuchang | Line 4 | Underground | 2021-12-26 |
| 彭刘杨 | Pengliuyang | 0.866 | 14.644 | Wuchang | | Underground | 2021-12-26 |
| 司门口黄鹤楼 | Simenkou & Yellow Crane Tower | 0.603 | 15.247 | Wuchang | | Underground | 2021-12-26 |
| 昙华林武胜门 | Tanhualin & Wushengmen | 0.878 | 16.125 | Wuchang | | Underground | 2021-12-26 |
| 积玉桥 | Jiyuqiao | 0.834 | 16.959 | Wuchang | Line 2 | Underground | 2021-12-26 |
| 三层楼 | Sancenglou | 1.070 | 18.029 | Wuchang | | Underground | 2021-12-26 |
| 三角路 | Sanjiao Road | 1.838 | 19.867 | Wuchang | | Underground | 2021-12-26 |
| 徐家棚 | Xujiapeng | 1.261 | 21.128 | Wuchang | Line 7 Line 8 | Underground | 2021-12-26 |
| 杨园铁四院 | Yangyuan & Tiesiyuan | 1.213 | 22.341 | Wuchang | | Underground | 2021-12-26 |
| 余家头 | Yujiatou | 1.283 | 23.624 | Wuchang | | Underground | 2021-12-26 |
| 科普公园 | Science Park | 1.601 | 25.225 | Qingshan | | Underground | 2021-12-26 |
| 建设二路 | Jianshe 2nd Road | 1.374 | 26.599 | Qingshan | | Underground | 2021-12-26 |
| 和平公园 | Heping Park | 1.231 | 27.830 | Qingshan | | Underground | 2021-12-26 |
| 红钢城 | Honggangcheng | 1.627 | 29.457 | Qingshan | | Underground | 2021-12-26 |
| 青宜居 | Qingyiju | 1.857 | 31.314 | Qingshan | | Underground | 2021-12-26 |
| 工人村 | Gongrencun | 1.555 | 32.869 | Qingshan | | Underground | 2021-12-26 |
| 武钢 | Wugang | 1.884 | 34.753 | Qingshan | | Underground | 2021-12-26 |
| 厂前 | Changqian | 1.432 | 36.185 | Hongshan | | Underground | 2021-12-26 |
| 武汉站东广场 | East Square of Wuhan Railway Station | 1.031 | 37.216 | Hongshan | Line 4 (Note: Out-of-station transfer) Line 19 (Note: Out-of-station transfer) | Underground | 2021-12-26 |

== Line 6 ==
Line 6
| Station name (Chinese) | Station name (English) | Interstation distance (km) | Distance from origin (km) | District | Transfers | Layout | Opened |
| 新城十一路 | Xincheng 11th Road | — | 0 | Dongxihu | | Underground | 2021-12-26 |
| 码头潭公园 | Matoutan Park | 1.496 | 1.496 | Dongxihu | Line 1 | Underground | 2021-12-26 |
| 五环体育中心 | Five Rings Sports Center | 1.176 | 2.672 | Dongxihu | | Underground | 2021-12-26 |
| 二雅路 | Erya Road | 1.570 | 4.242 | Dongxihu | | Underground | 2021-12-26 |
| 海口三路 | Haikou 3rd Road | 1.412 | 5.654 | Dongxihu | | Underground | 2021-12-26 |
| 金银湖公园 | Jinyinhu Park | 1.371 | 7.025 | Dongxihu | | Underground | 2016-12-28 |
| 金银湖 | Jinyinhu | 2.391 | 9.416 | Dongxihu | | Underground | 2016-12-28 |
| 园博园北 | Garden Expo North | 1.748 | 11.164 | Dongxihu | Line 7 | Underground | 2016-12-28 |
| 轻工大学 | Polytechnic Univ. | 1.202 | 12.366 | Dongxihu | | Underground | 2016-12-28 |
| 常青花园 | Changqinghuayuan | 0.961 | 13.327 | Dongxihu | Line 2 | Underground | 2016-12-28 |
| 杨汊湖 | Yangchahu | 2.110 | 15.437 | Jianghan | | Underground | 2016-12-28 |
| 石桥 | Shiqiao | 0.844 | 16.281 | Jianghan | Line 12 | Underground | 2016-12-28 |
| 唐家墩 | Tangjiadun | 1.477 | 17.758 | Jianghan | Line 10 | Underground | 2016-12-28 |
| 三眼桥 | Sanyanqiao | 0.953 | 18.711 | Jianghan | | Underground | 2016-12-28 |
| 香港路 | Xianggang Road | 1.024 | 19.735 | Jiang'an/Jianghan | Line 3 Line 7 | Underground | 2016-12-28 |
| 苗栗路 | Miaoli Road | 0.864 | 20.599 | Jiang'an | | Underground | 2016-12-28 |
| 大智路 | Dazhi Road | 0.804 | 21.403 | Jiang'an | Line 1 | Underground | 2016-12-28 |
| 江汉路 | Jianghan Road | 1.553 | 22.956 | Jianghan | Line 2 | Underground | 2016-12-28 |
| 六渡桥 | Liuduqiao | 0.851 | 23.807 | Jianghan | | Underground | 2016-12-28 |
| 汉正街 | Hanzheng Street | 0.977 | 24.784 | Qiaokou | | Underground | 2016-12-28 |
| 武胜路 | Wusheng Road | 0.762 | 25.546 | Qiaokou | | Underground | 2016-12-28 |
| 琴台 | Qintai | 1.857 | 27.403 | Hanyang | | Underground | 2016-12-28 |
| 钟家村 | Zhongjiacun | 0.933 | 28.336 | Hanyang | Line 4 | Underground | 2016-12-28 |
| 马鹦路 | Maying Road | 1.282 | 29.618 | Hanyang | | Underground | 2016-12-28 |
| 建港 | Jiangang | 1.478 | 31.096 | Hanyang | | Underground | 2016-12-28 |
| 前进村 | Qianjincun | 0.953 | 32.049 | Hanyang | | Underground | 2016-12-28 |
| 国博中心北 | North International Expo Center | 1.525 | 33.574 | Hanyang | | Underground | 2016-12-28 |
| 国博中心南 | South International Expo Center | 0.756 | 34.330 | Hanyang | Line 16 Line 12 | Underground | 2016-12-28 |
| 老关村 | Laoguancun | 1.826 | 36.156 | WETDZ (Note: full name: Wuhan Economic & Technological Development Zone) | Line 16 | Underground | 2016-12-28 |
| 江城大道 | Jiangcheng Boulevard | 2.805 | 38.961 | WETDZ | Line 10 | Underground | 2016-12-28 |
| 车城东路 | Checheng East Road | 2.279 | 41.240 | WETDZ | | Underground | 2016-12-28 |
| 东风公司 | Dongfeng Motor Corp. | 1.297 | 42.537 | WETDZ | Line 3 | Underground | 2016-12-28 |

== Line 7 ==
Line 7
| Station name (Chinese) | Station name (English) | Interstation distance (km) | Distance from origin (km) | District | Transfers | Layout | Opened |
| 横店 | Hengdian | — | 0 | Huangpi | | Elevated | 2022-12-30 |
| 裕福路 | Yufu Road | 2.336 | 2.336 | Huangpi | | Elevated | 2022-12-30 |
| 天阳大道 | Tianyang Boulevard | 2.380 | 4.716 | Huangpi | | Elevated | 2022-12-30 |
| 腾龙大道 | Tenglong Boulevard | 4.479 | 9.195 | Huangpi | | Underground | 2022-12-30 |
| 巨龙大道 | Julong Boulevard | 1.809 | 11.004 | Huangpi | Line 2 | Underground | 2022-12-30 |
| 汤云海路 | Tangyunhai Road | 2.524 | 13.528 | Huangpi | | Underground | 2022-12-30 |
| 马池 | Machi | 5.154 | 18.682 | Dongxihu | | Underground | 2022-12-30 |
| 园博园北 | Garden Expo North | 2.208 | 20.890 | Dongxihu | Line 6 | Underground | 2018-10-01 |
| 园博园 | Garden Expo | 2.137 | 23.027 | Jianghan/Qiaokou | | Underground | 2018-10-01 |
| 常码头 | Changmatou | 1.885 | 24.912 | Qiaokou | | Underground | 2018-10-01 |
| 武汉商务区 | Wuhan Business District | 1.586 | 26.498 | Jianghan | Line 3 | Underground | 2018-10-01 |
| 王家墩东 | Wangjiadun East | 1.482 | 27.980 | Jianghan | Line 2 | Underground | 2018-10-01 |
| 取水楼 | Qushuilou | 1.164 | 29.144 | Jianghan | | Underground | 2018-10-01 |
| 香港路 | Xianggang Road | 1.458 | 30.602 | Jianghan/Jiang'an | Line 3 Line 6 | Underground | 2018-10-01 |
| 三阳路 | Sanyang Road | 1.846 | 32.448 | Jiang'an | Line 1 | Underground | 2018-10-01 |
| 徐家棚 | Xujiapeng | 3.502 | 35.950 | Wuchang | Line 5 Line 8 | Underground | 2018-10-01 |
| 湖北大学 | Hubei University | 1.591 | 37.541 | Wuchang | | Underground | 2018-10-01 |
| 新河街 | Xinhe Street | 2.067 | 39.608 | Wuchang | | Underground | 2018-10-01 |
| 螃蟹岬 | Pangxiejia | 1.141 | 40.749 | Wuchang | Line 2 | Underground | 2018-10-01 |
| 小东门 | Xiaodongmen | 0.859 | 41.608 | Wuchang | | Underground | 2018-10-01 |
| 武昌火车站 | Wuchang Railway Station | 1.374 | 42.982 | Wuchang | Line 4 | Underground | 2018-10-01 |
| 瑞安街 | Rui'an Street | 1.860 | 44.842 | Wuchang | | Underground | 2018-10-01 |
| 建安街 | Jian'an Street | 1.383 | 46.225 | Hongshan | | Underground | 2018-10-01 |
| 湖工大 | Hubei University of Technology | 2.294 | 48.519 | Hongshan | | Underground | 2018-10-01 |
| 板桥 | Banqiao | 1.067 | 49.586 | Hongshan | | Underground | 2018-10-01 |
| 野芷湖 | Yezhihu | 1.717 | 51.303 | Hongshan | Line 8 | Underground | 2018-10-01 |
| 新路村 | Xinlucun | 2.391 | 53.694 | Hongshan | | Underground | 2018-12-28 |
| 大花岭 | Dahualing | 3.438 | 57.132 | Jiangxia | | Underground | 2018-12-28 |
| 江夏客厅 | Jiangxiaketing | 2.507 | 59.639 | Jiangxia | | Underground | 2018-12-28 |
| 谭鑫培公园 | Tanxinpei Park | 2.000 | 61.639 | Jiangxia | | Underground | 2018-12-28 |
| 北华街 | Beihua Street | 1.610 | 63.249 | Jiangxia | | Underground | 2018-12-28 |
| 纸坊大街 | Zhifang Avenue | 1.361 | 64.610 | Jiangxia | | Underground | 2018-12-28 |
| 青龙山地铁小镇 | Qinglongshan Ditiexiaozhen | 3.243 | 67.853 | Jiangxia | | Underground | 2018-12-28 |

== Line 8 ==
Line 8
| Station name (Chinese) | Station name (English) | Interstation distance (km) | Distance from origin (km) | District | Transfers | Layout | Opened |
| 金潭路 | Jintan Road | — | 0 | Dongxihu | | Underground | 2017-12-26 |
| 宏图大道 | Hongtu Boulevard | 0.855 | 0.855 | Dongxihu | Line 2 Line 3 | Underground | 2017-12-26 |
| 塔子湖 | Tazihu | 1.890 | 2.745 | Jiang'an | | Underground | 2017-12-26 |
| 中一路 | Zhongyi Road | 1.648 | 4.393 | Jiang'an | Line 12 | Underground | 2017-12-26 |
| 竹叶山 | Zhuyeshan | 1.574 | 5.967 | Jiang'an | Line 10 | Underground | 2017-12-26 |
| 赵家条 | Zhaojiatiao | 1.394 | 7.361 | Jiang'an | Line 3 | Underground | 2017-12-26 |
| 黄浦路 | Huangpu Road | 1.419 | 8.780 | Jiang'an | Line 1 | Underground | 2017-12-26 |
| 徐家棚 | Xujiapeng | 3.494 | 12.274 | Wuchang | Line 5 Line 7 | Underground | 2017-12-26 |
| 徐东 | Xudong | 0.992 | 13.266 | Wuchang/Hongshan | | Underground | 2017-12-26 |
| 汪家墩 | Wangjiadun | 0.747 | 14.013 | Wuchang/Hongshan | Line 12 | Underground | 2017-12-26 |
| 岳家嘴 | Yuejiazui | 1.318 | 15.331 | Wuchang/Hongshan | Line 4 | Underground | 2017-12-26 |
| 梨园 | Liyuan | 0.873 | 16.204 | Wuchang/Hongshan | | Underground | 2017-12-26 |
| 省博湖北日报 | Hubei Provincial Museum & Hubei Daily | 1.881 | 18.085 | Wuchang | | Underground | 2021-1-2 |
| 中南医院 | Zhongnan Hospital | 1.326 | 19.411 | Wuchang | | Underground | 2021-1-2 |
| 水果湖 | Shuiguohu | 1.239 | 20.650 | Wuchang | | Underground | 2021-1-2 |
| 洪山路 | Hongshan Road | 0.758 | 21.408 | Wuchang | | Underground | 2021-1-2 |
| 小洪山 | Xiaohongshan | 1.812 | 23.220 | Wuchang | | Underground | 2021-1-2 |
| 街道口 | Jiedaokou | 1.307 | 24.527 | Hongshan | Line 2 | Underground | 2021-1-2 |
| 马房山 | Mafangshan | 1.172 | 25.699 | Hongshan | Line 11 | Underground | 2021-1-2 |
| 文治街 | Wenzhi Street | 1.700 | 27.399 | Hongshan | | Underground | 2021-1-2 |
| 文昌路 | Wenchang Road | 1.952 | 29.351 | Hongshan | | Underground | 2021-1-2 |
| 省农科院 | Hubei Academy of Agricultural Sciences | 1.686 | 31.037 | Hongshan | | Underground | 2021-1-2 |
| 马湖 | Mahu | 1.100 | 32.137 | Hongshan | | Underground | 2021-1-2 |
| 野芷湖 | Yezhihu | 1.228 | 33.365 | Hongshan | Line 7 | Underground | 2019-11-06 |
| 黄家湖地铁小镇 | Huangjiahu Ditiexiaozhen | 3.748 | 37.113 | Jiangxia | | Underground | 2019-11-06 |
| 军运村 | Military Athletes' Village | 1.084 | 38.197 | Jiangxia | | Underground | 2019-11-06 |

== Line 11 ==
Line 11
| Station name (Chinese) | Station name (English) | Interstation distance (km) | Distance from origin (km) | District | Transfers | Layout | Opened |
| 武汉东站 | Wuhandong Railway Station | — | 0 | DNTDZ | Line 2 | Underground | 2018-10-01 |
| 湖口 | Hukou | 1.468 | 1.468 | DNTDZ | | Underground | 2018-10-01 |
| 光谷同济医院 | Tongji Hospital | 1.940 | 3.408 | DNTDZ | | Underground | 2018-10-01 |
| 光谷生物园 | Guanggushengwuyuan | 1.420 | 4.828 | DNTDZ | | Underground | 2018-10-01 |
| 光谷四路 | Guanggu 4th Road | 1.075 | 5.903 | DNTDZ | | Underground | 2018-10-01 |
| 光谷五路 | Guanggu 5th Road | 1.287 | 7.190 | DNTDZ | Line 19 | Underground | 2018-10-01 |
| 光谷六路 | Guanggu 6th Road | 0.926 | 8.116 | DNTDZ | | Underground | 2018-10-01 |
| 豹澥 | Baoxie | 1.133 | 9.249 | DNTDZ | | Underground | 2018-10-01 |
| 光谷七路 | Guanggu 7th Road | 1.067 | 10.316 | DNTDZ | | Underground | 2018-10-01 |
| 长岭山 | Changlingshan | 2.802 | 13.118 | DNTDZ | | Underground | 2018-10-01 |
| 未来一路 | Weilai 1st Road | 2.153 | 15.271 | DNTDZ | | Underground | 2018-10-01 |
| 未来三路 | Weilai 3rd Road | 2.029 | 17.300 | DNTDZ | | Underground | 2018-10-01 |
| 左岭 | Zuoling | 1.444 | 18.744 | DNTDZ | | Underground | 2018-10-01 |
| 葛店南站 | Gediannan Railway Station | 3.786 | 22.530 | Huarong, Ezhou | | Underground | 2021-01-02 |

== Line 12 ==
Line 12
| Station name (Chinese) | Station name (English) | Transfer | Distance km | District |
| 墨水湖公园 | Moshuihu Park | | | Hanyang District |
| 港口村 | Gangkoucun | | | Hanyang District |
| 芳草路 | Fangcao Road | | | Hanyang District |
| 四新中路 | Sixin Middle Road | | | Hanyang District |
| 四新南路 | Sixin South Road | | | Hanyang District |
| 国博新城 | Guoboxincheng | | | Hanyang District |
| 国博中心南 | South International Expo Center | 6 16 | | Hanyang District |
| 夹套河 | Jiataohe | | | Hongshan District |
| 市农科院 | Wuhan Academy of Agricultural Sciences | | | Hongshan District |
| 光霞 | Guangxia | 5 | | Hongshan District |
| 省农科院南 | Hubei Academy of Agricultural Sciences South | | | Hongshan District |
| 楚祥大道 | Chuxiang Boulevard | | | Hongshan District |
| 富安街 | Fu'an Street | | | Hongshan District |
| 瑞安街东 | Rui'an Street East | | | Wuchang District |
| 武昌站东广场 | East Square of Wuchang Railway Station | 11; 4 7 (Both OSI via Wuchang Railway Station); WCN | | Wuchang District |
| 十五中 | Wuhan No.15 Senior Middle School | | | Wuchang District |
| 何家垅 | Hejialong | | | Wuchang District |
| 公正路 | Gongzheng Road | | | Wuchang District |
| 秦园中路 | Qinyuan Middle Road | | | Wuchang District |
| 汪家墩 | Wangjiadun | 8 | | Wuchang District |
| 团结大道 | Tuanjie Boulevard | | | Wuchang District |
| 园林路 | Yuanlin Road | 4 | | Qingshan District |
| 钢都花园 | Gangduhuayuan | 10 (U/C) | | Qingshan District |
| 科普公园 | Science Park | 5 | | Qingshan District |
| 丹水池 | Danshuichi | 1 (OSI) | | Jiang'an District |
| 百步亭 | Baibuting | | | Jiang'an District |
| 兴业路 | Xingye Road | 3 | | Jiang'an District |
| 后湖四路 | Houhu 4th Road | | | Jiang'an District |
| 中一路 | Zhongyi Road | 8 Yangluo | | Jiang'an District |
| 石桥 | Shiqiao | 6 | | Jiang'an District |
| 汉口站北广场 | North Square of Hankou Railway Station | 2; 10 (U/C); HKN | | Jianghan District / Qiaokou District |
| 华安里 | Hua'anli | | | Jianghan District / Qiaokou District |
| 汉西路北 | Hanxi Road North | | | Jianghan District / Qiaokou District |
| 双墩 | Shuangdun | 3 | | Qiaokou District |
| 汉西路南 | Hanxi Road South | | | Qiaokou District |
| 汉钢 | Hangang | | | Hanyang District |
| 十里铺 | Shilipu | 4 | | Hanyang District |

== Line 16 ==
Line 16
| Station name (Chinese) | Station name (English) | Interstation distance (km) | Distance from origin (km) | District | Transfers | Layout | Opened |
| 国博中心南 | South International Expo Center | — | 0 | Hanyang | Line 6 Line 12 | Underground | 2021-12-26 |
| 老关村 | Laoguancun | 1.570 | 1.570 | WETDZ (Note: full name: Wuhan Economic & Technological Development Zone) | Line 6 | Underground | 2021-12-26 |
| 南太子湖 | South Taizihu | 1.971 | 3.541 | WETDZ | | Underground | 2021-12-26 |
| 沌口 | Zhuankou | 2.202 | 5.743 | WETDZ | | Underground | 2021-12-26 |
| 小军山 | Xiaojunshan | 8.050 | 13.793 | WETDZ | | Underground | 2021-12-26 |
| 枫林 | Fenglin | 2.049 | 15.842 | WETDZ | | Underground | 2021-12-26 |
| 大军山 | Dajunshan | 1.950 | 17.792 | WETDZ | | Underground | 2021-12-26 |
| 桂子湖 | Guizihu | 4.420 | 22.212 | WETDZ | | Elevated | 2021-12-26 |
| 马影河 | Mayinghe | 3.163 | 25.375 | WETDZ | | Elevated | 2021-12-26 |
| 协子河 | Xiezihe | 1.363 | 26.738 | WETDZ | | Elevated | 2021-12-26 |
| 湾湖 | Wanhu | 1.690 | 28.428 | WETDZ | | Elevated | 2021-12-26 |
| 周家河 | Zhoujiahe | 3.264 | 31.692 | WETDZ | | Elevated | 2021-12-26 |
| 纱帽 | Shamao | 3.197 | 34.889 | WETDZ | | Elevated | 2022-12-30 |
| 通航机场 | Hannan General Airport | 1.569 | 36.458 | WETDZ | | Elevated | 2022-12-30 |

== Line 19 ==
Line 19
| Station name (Chinese) | Station name (English) | Interstation distance (km) | Distance from origin (km) | District | Transfers | Layout | Opened |
| 武汉站西广场 | West Square of Wuhan Railway Station | — | 0 | Hongshan | Line 4 (Note: Out-of-station transfer) Line 5 (Note: Out-of-station transfer) | Underground | 2023-12-30 |
| 武东 | Wudong | 4.952 | 4.952 | Qingshan | | Underground | 2023-12-30 |
| 鼓架山 | Gujiashan | 3.551 | 8.503 | Hongshan | | Underground | 2023-12-30 |
| 花山新城 | Huashanxincheng | 4.431 | 12.934 | DNTDZ | | Underground | 2023-12-30 |
| 花山河 | Huashanhe | 1.981 | 14.915 | DNTDZ | | Underground | 2023-12-30 |
| 光谷五路 | Guanggu 5th Road | 6.758 | 21.673 | DNTDZ | Line 11 | Underground | 2023-12-30 |
| 新月溪公园 | Xinyuexi Park | 1.013 | 22.686 | DNTDZ | | Underground | 2023-12-30 |

== Yangluo Line (Line 21) ==
Yangluo Line
| Station name (Chinese) | Station name (English) | Interstation distance (km) | Distance from origin (km) | District | Transfers | Layout | Opened |
| 中一路 | Zhongyi Road | — | 0 | Jiang'an | Line 8 Line 12 | Underground | 29 October 2026 |
| 新春 | Xinchun | | | Jiang'an | | Underground | 29 October 2026 |
| 后湖大道 | Houhu Boulevard | | | Jiang'an | Line 3 | Underground | 2017-12-26 |
| 百步亭花园路 | Baibutinghuayuan Road | 0.985 | 0.985 | Jiang'an | | Underground | 2017-12-26 |
| 新荣 | Xinrong | 1.759 | 2.744 | Jiang'an | Line 1 | Underground | 2017-12-26 |
| 幸福湾 | Xingfuwan | 2.042 | 4.786 | Jiang'an | | Underground | 2017-12-26 |
| 朱家河 | Zhujiahe | 2.351 | 7.137 | Jiang'an | | Underground | 2017-12-26 |
| 谌家矶 | Shenjiaji | 0.881 | 8.018 | Jiang'an | | Underground | 2017-12-26 |
| 青龙 | Qinglong | 3.164 | 11.182 | Huangpi | | Elevated | 2017-12-26 |
| 高车 | Gaoche | 2.294 | 13.476 | Huangpi | | Elevated | 2017-12-26 |
| 武湖 | Wuhu | 2.230 | 15.706 | Huangpi | | Elevated | 2017-12-26 |
| 沙口 | Shakou | 4.628 | 20.334 | Huangpi | | Elevated | 2017-12-26 |
| 军民村 | Junmincun | 3.785 | 24.119 | Xinzhou | | Elevated | 2017-12-26 |
| 武生院 | Wuhan Bioengineering Institute | 1.018 | 25.137 | Xinzhou | | Elevated | 2017-12-26 |
| 阳逻 | Yangluo | 2.787 | 27.924 | Xinzhou | | Elevated | 2017-12-26 |
| 阳逻开发区 | Yangluo Development Zone | 1.460 | 29.384 | Xinzhou | | Elevated | 2017-12-26 |
| 施岗 | Shigang | 3.232 | 32.616 | Xinzhou | | Elevated | 2017-12-26 |
| 金台 | Jintai | 1.959 | 34.575 | Xinzhou | | Elevated | 2017-12-26 |
