= Houhu Boulevard station =

Metro station in Wuhan, China

Houhu Boulevard 后湖大道 metro
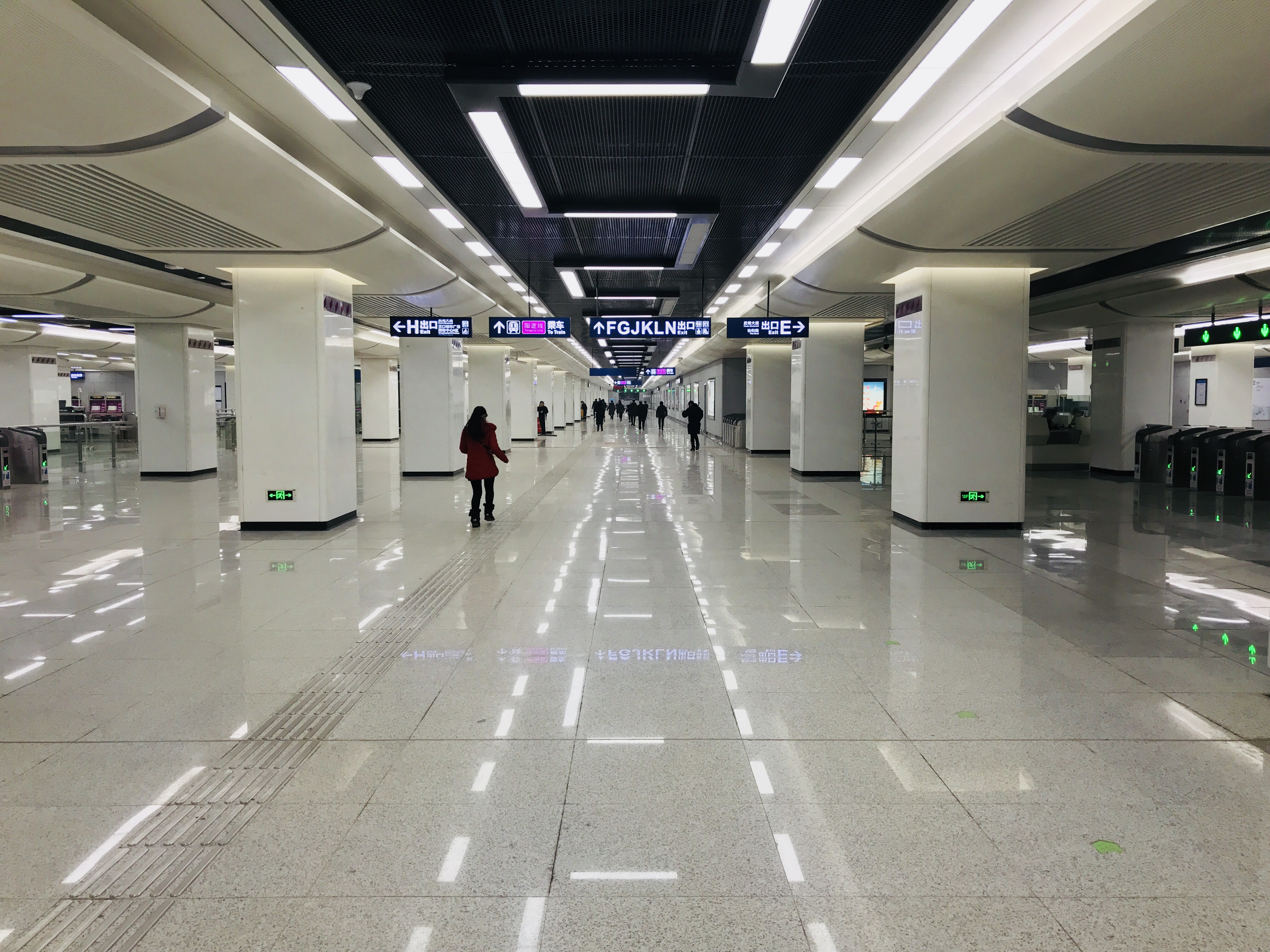

General information
- Location: Jiang'an District, Wuhan, Hubei; China
- Operator: Wuhan Metro Co., Ltd
- Lines: Line 3; Yangluo Line
- Platforms: 4 (2 island platforms)

Construction
- Structure type: Underground

History
- Opened: December 28, 2015 (Line 3); December 26, 2017 (Yangluo line)

Services
| Preceding station | Wuhan Metro | Following station |
|---|---|---|
| Citizens Home towards Hongtu Boulevard | Line 3 | Xingye Road towards Zhuanyang Boulevard |
| Xinchun towards Zhongyi Road | Yangluo Line | Baibutinghuayuan Road towards Jintai |
Location

Houhu Boulevard Station (Chinese: 后湖大道站) is an interchange station between Line 3 and Yangluo line of the Wuhan Metro. It entered revenue service on December 28, 2015. It is located in Jiang'an District. It was the western terminus of Yangluo line until the extension to Zhongyi Road opened on October 29, 2026.

== Station layout ==
| G | Entrances and Exits | Exits A-H, J-L, N |
| B1 | Concourse | Faregates, Station Agent |
| B2 | Northbound | ← Line 3 towards Citizens Home (Hongtu Boulevard) |
| B2 | Island platform, doors will open on the left |
| B2 | Southbound | Line 3 towards Xingye Road (Zhuanyang Boulevard) → |
| B3 | Westbound | ← Yangluo Line towards Zhongyi Road (Xinchun) |
| B3 | Island platform, doors will open on the left |
| B3 | Eastbound | Yangluo Line towards Jintai (Baibutinghuayuan Road) → |

== Gallery ==
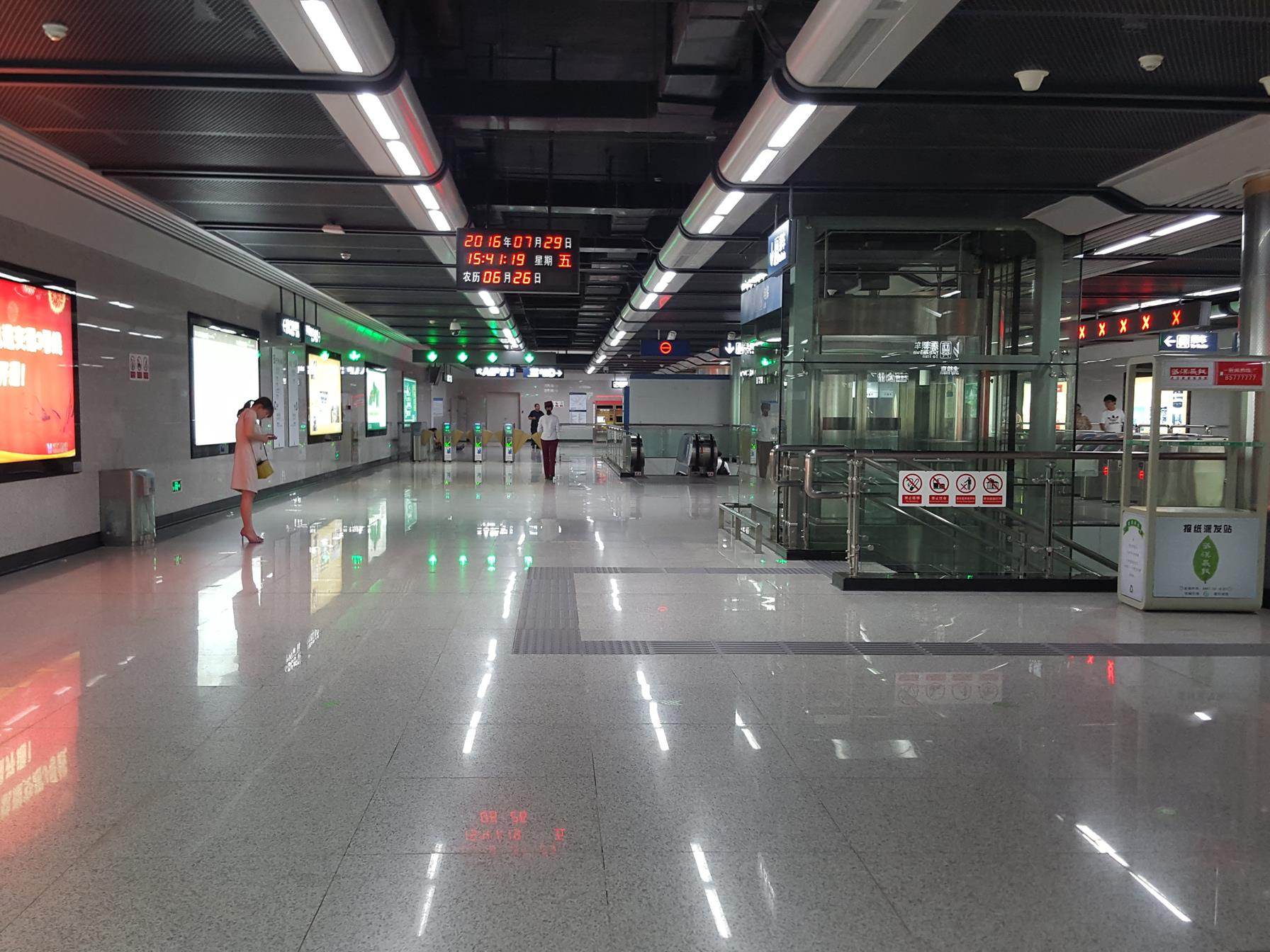
Concourse

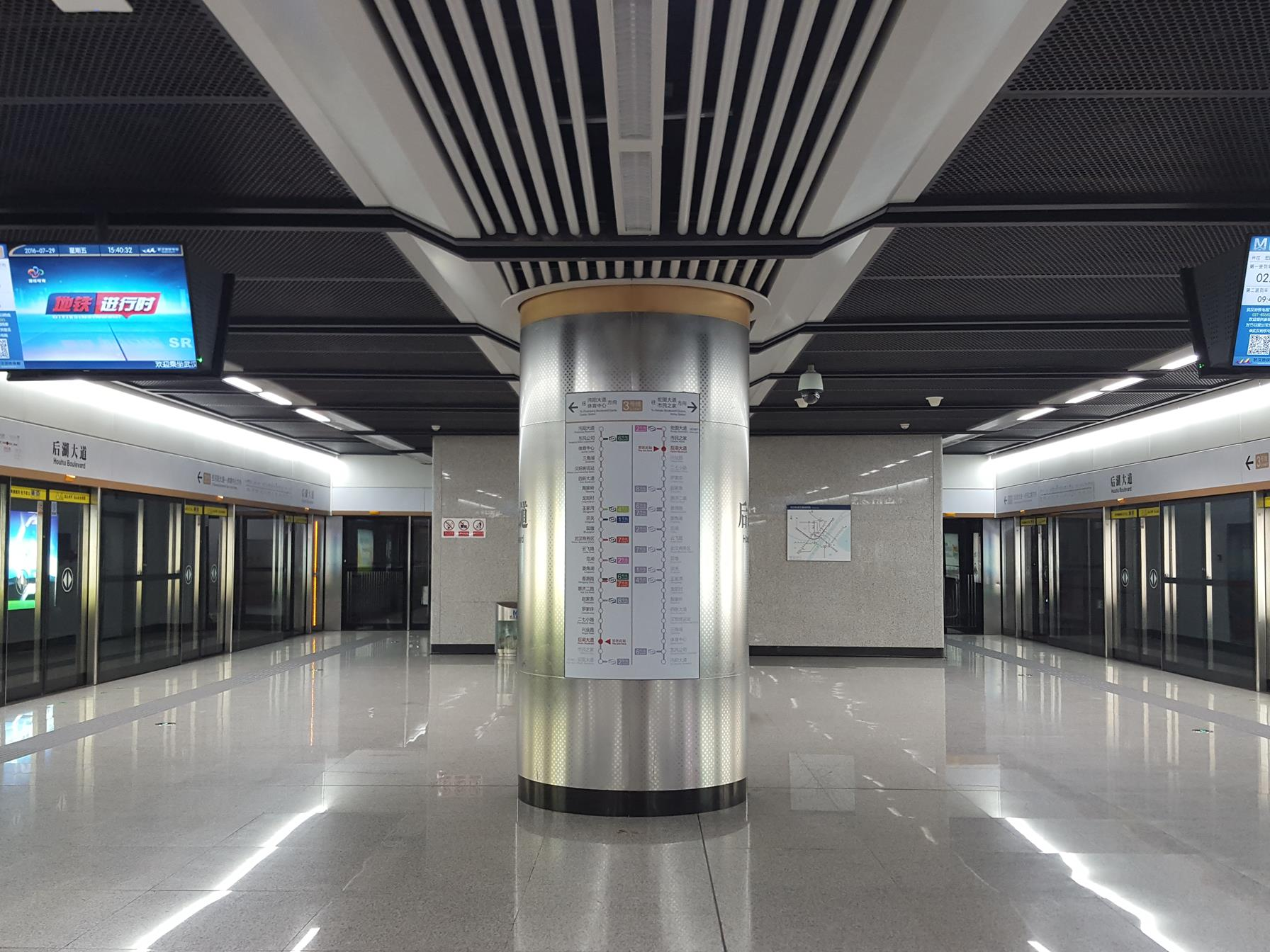
Line 3 platform
