= Wuhan Bioengineering Institute station =

Metro station in Wuhan, China

Wuhan Bioengineering Institute 武生院 metro
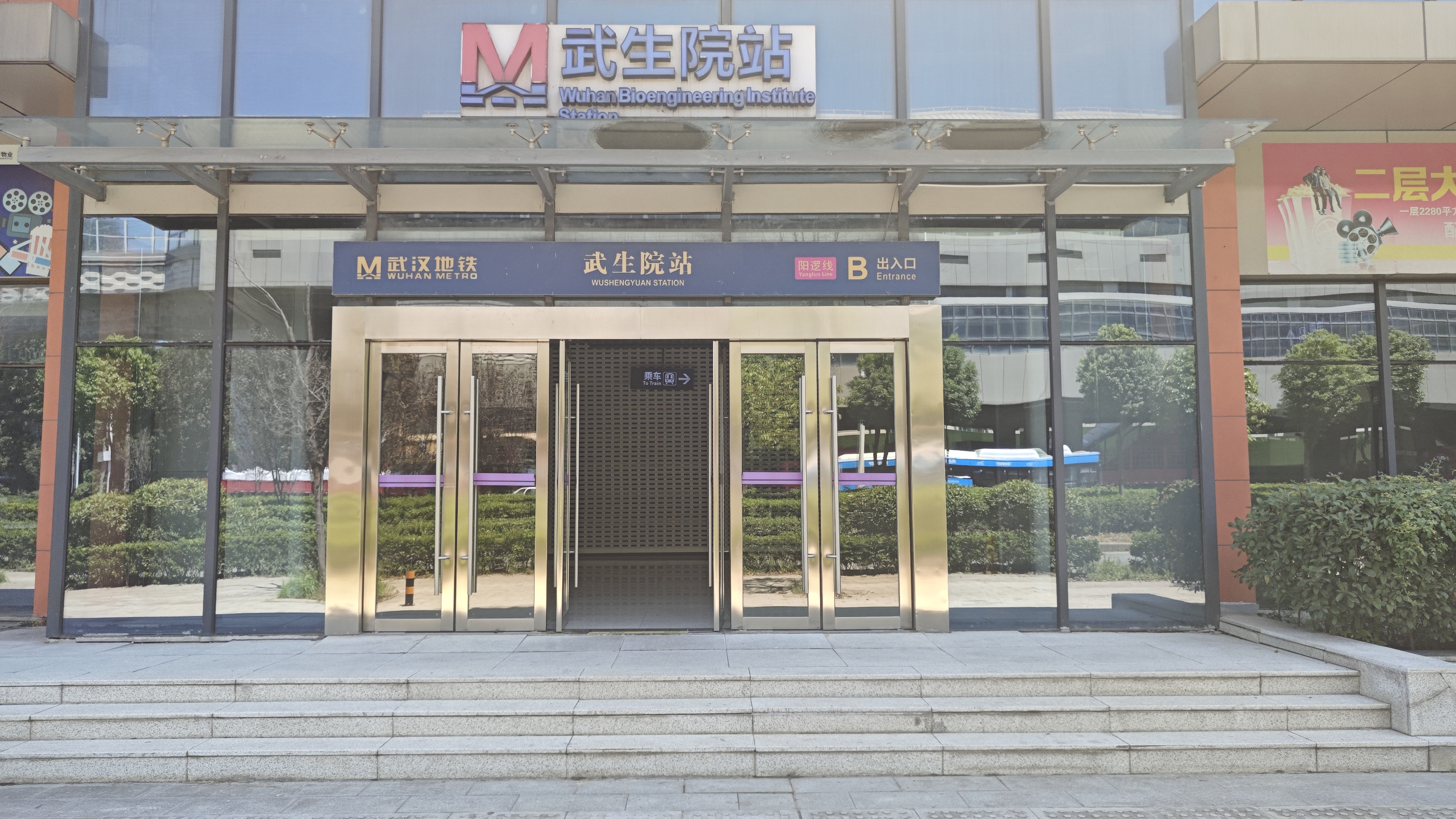
- Entrance B

General information
- Location: Xinzhou District, Wuhan, Hubei; China
- Operator: Wuhan Metro Co., Ltd
- Line: Yangluo Line
- Platforms: 2 (2 side platforms)

Construction
- Structure type: Elevated

History
- Opened: December 26, 2017 (Yangluo Line)

Services
Preceding station	Wuhan Metro	Following station
Junmincun towards Zhongyi Road	Yangluo Line	Yangluo towards Jintai
Location

Wuhan Bioengineering Institute Station (Chinese: 武生院站) is a station on the Yangluo Line of the Wuhan Metro. It entered revenue service on December 26, 2017. It is located in Xinzhou District and it serves the Wuhan Bioengineering Institute.

== Station layout ==
3F	Side platform, doors will open on the right
3F	Westbound	← Yangluo Line towards Zhongyi Road (Junmincun)
3F	Eastbound	Yangluo Line towards Jintai (Yangluo) →
3F	Side platform, doors will open on the right
2F	Concourse	Faregates, Station Agent
G	Entrances and Exits
