= Baibutinghuayuan Road station =

Metro station in Wuhan, China

Baibutinghuayuan Road 百步亭花园路 metro
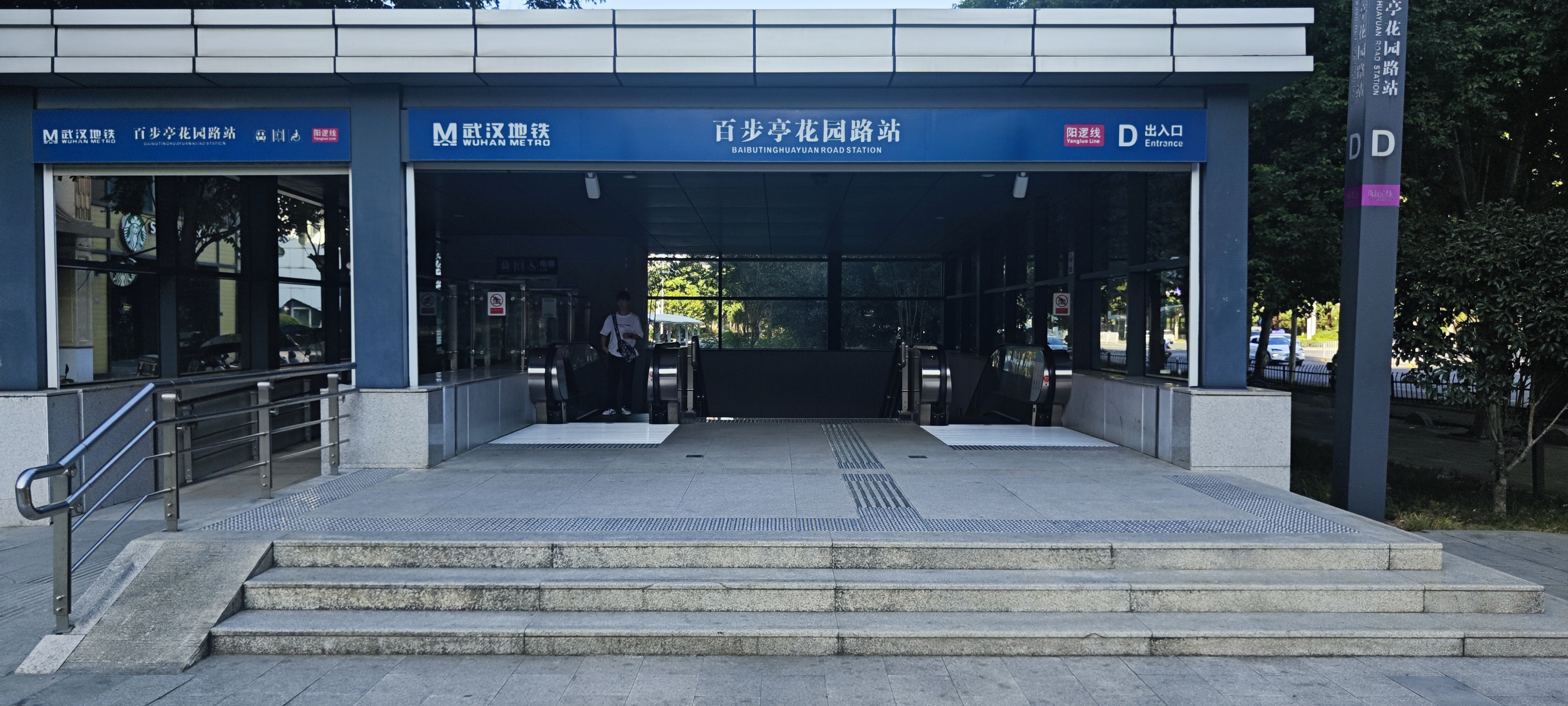
- Entrance D

General information
- Location: Jiang'an District, Wuhan, Hubei; China
- Coordinates: 30.6570°N 114.3103°E
- Operator: Wuhan Metro Co., Ltd
- Line: Yangluo Line
- Platforms: 2 (1 island platform)

Construction
- Structure type: Underground

History
- Opened: December 26, 2017 (Yangluo Line)

Services
| Preceding station | Wuhan Metro | Following station |
|---|---|---|
| Houhu Boulevard towards Zhongyi Road | Yangluo Line | Xinrong towards Jintai |
Location

Baibutinghuayuan Road Station (Chinese: 百步亭花园路站) is a station on the Yangluo Line of the Wuhan Metro. It entered revenue service on December 26, 2017. It is located in Jiang'an District.

== Station layout ==
| G | Entrances and Exits | Exits A-D |
| B1 | Concourse | Faregates, Station Agent |
| B2 | Westbound | ← Yangluo Line towards Zhongyi Road (Houhu Boulevard) |
| B2 | Island platform, doors will open on the left |
| B2 | Eastbound | Yangluo Line towards Jintai (Xinrong Long-Distance Bus Station) → |
