= Xingfuwan station =

Metro station in Wuhan, China

Xingfuwan 幸福湾 metro
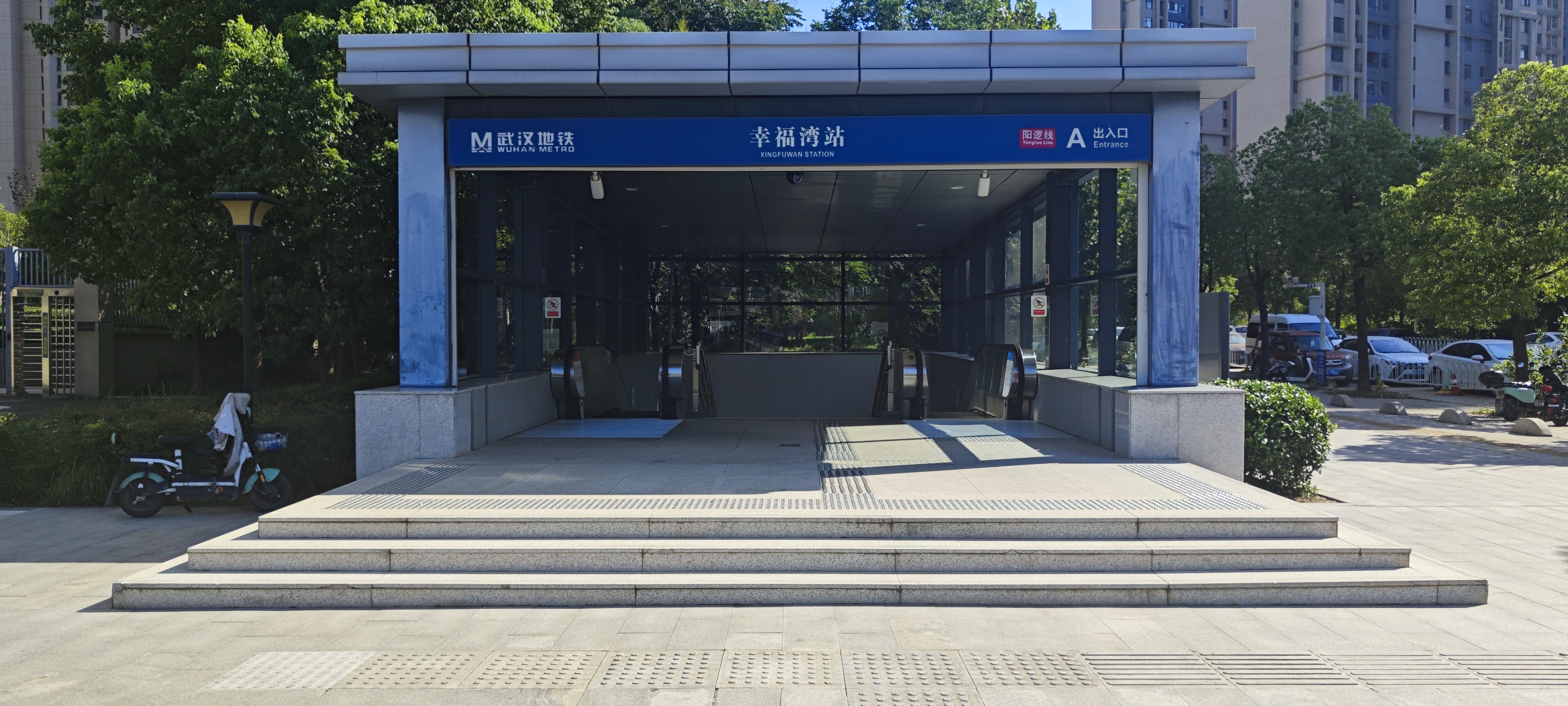
- Entrance A

General information
- Location: Jiang'an District, Wuhan, Hubei; China
- Coordinates: 30.67422°N 114.33854°E
- Operator: Wuhan Metro Co., Ltd
- Line: Yangluo Line
- Platforms: 2 (1 island platform)

Construction
- Structure type: Underground

History
- Opened: December 26, 2017 (Yangluo Line)

Services
Preceding station	Wuhan Metro	Following station
Xinrong towards Zhongyi Road	Yangluo Line	Zhujiahe towards Jintai
Location

Xingfuwan Station (Chinese: 幸福湾站) is a station on the Yangluo Line of the Wuhan Metro. It entered revenue service on December 26, 2017. It is located in Jiang'an District.

== Station layout ==
G	Entrances and Exits
B1	Concourse	Faregates, Station Agent
B2	Westbound	← Yangluo Line towards Zhongyi Road (Xinrong Long-Distance Bus Station)
B2	Island platform, doors will open on the left
B2	Eastbound	Yangluo Line towards Jintai (Zhujiahe) →
