= Xinrong station =

Metro station in Wuhan, China

Xinrong 新荣 metro
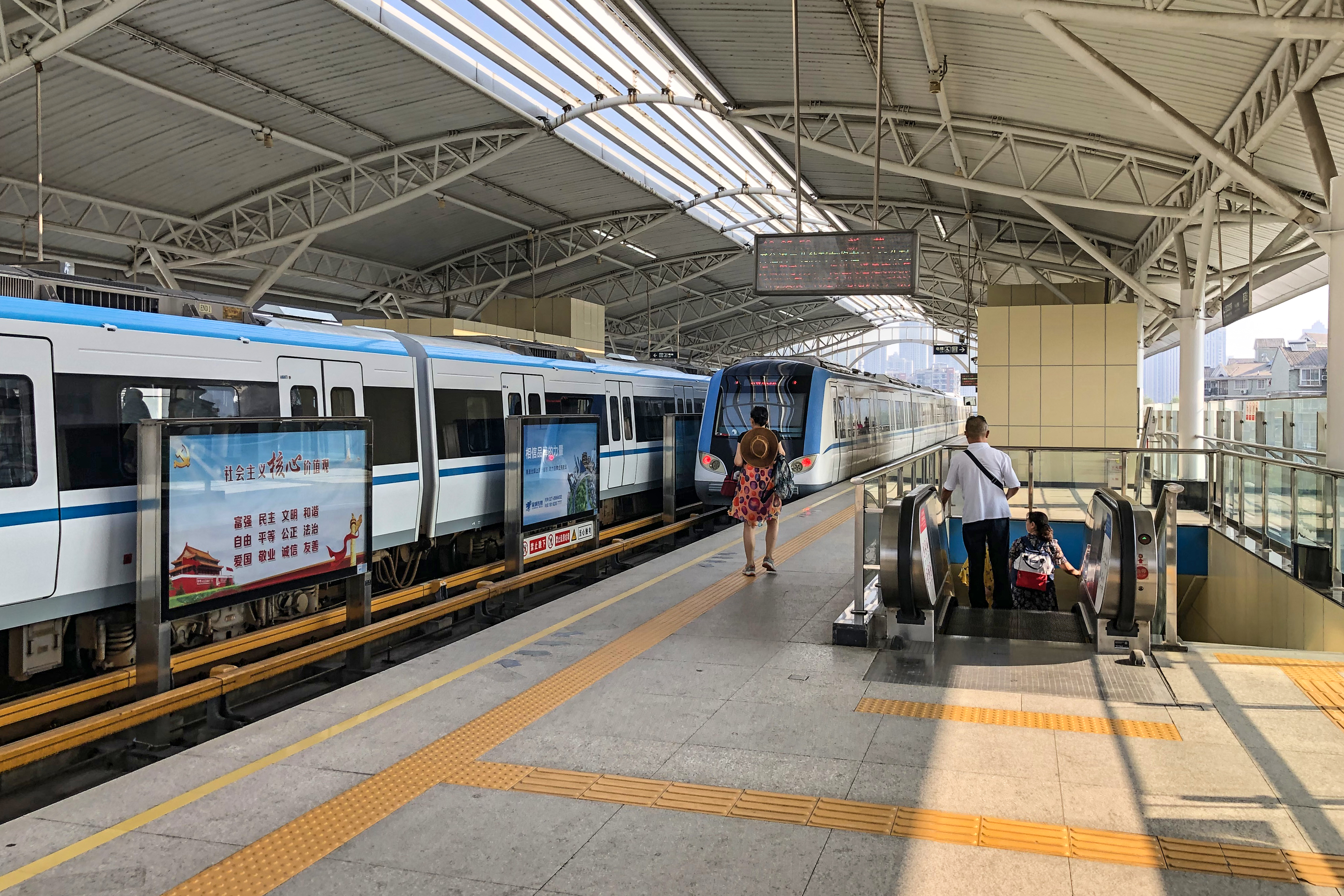
- Line 1 platform (August 2019)

General information
- Location: Jiang'an District, Wuhan, Hubei; China
- Coordinates: 30°39′24″N 114°20′05″E
- Operator: Wuhan Metro Co., Ltd
- Lines: Line 1 Yangluo Line
- Platforms: 3 (2 side platforms for line 1, one island platform for Yangluo line)

Other information
- Station code: 105

History
- Opened: July 29, 2010; 16 years ago (Line 1); December 26, 2017; 8 years ago (Yangluo Line)

Services
| Preceding station | Wuhan Metro | Following station |
|---|---|---|
| Danshuichi towards Jinghe | Line 1 | Dijiao towards Hankou North |
| Baibutinghuayuan Road towards Zhongyi Road | Yangluo Line | Xingfuwan towards Jintai |
Location

Xinrong (simplified Chinese: 新荣; traditional Chinese: 新榮) is a station on Line 1 and Yangluo line of Wuhan Metro.

Line 1 station opened along with the completion of Line 1, Phase 2 on 29 July 2010. The Yangluo line station entered revenue service on December 26, 2017, it was named as Xinrong Long-Distance Bus Station (Chinese: 新荣客运站), but on 30 December 2022 a transfer gateway within fare zones between Line 1 and Yangluo line has opened for business, and as a harmonious action of gateway open, the Yangluo line station has renamed to Xinrong.

It is an elevated station situated on Jiefang Avenue and located at the intersection of Jiefang Avenue and Hanhuang Road, with easy access to downtown bus transfers. The station has two side platforms serving trains from each direction.

== Station layout ==
Xinrong Station is a three-story elevated station built entirely along Jiefang Avenue.

| 3F | Side platform, doors open on the right |
| 3F | Westbound | ← Line 1 towards Jinghe (Danshuchi) |
| 3F | Eastbound | Line 1 towards Hankou North (Dijiao) → |
| 3F | Side platform, doors open on the right |
| 2F | Concourse | Faregates, Station Agent, transfer gateway |
| G | Entrances and Exits | Exits A, B, C, D, transfer gateway |
| B1 | Concourse | Faregates, Station Agent, transfer gateway |
| B2 | Westbound | ← Yangluo Line towards Zhongyi Road (Baibutinghuayuan Road) |
| B2 | Island platform, doors will open on the left |
| B2 | Eastbound | Yangluo Line towards Jintai (Xingfuwan) → |

== Exits ==
There are currently three exits in service:

- Exit A: Northwest side of Jiefang Avenue. Accessible to Xinrong Long-Distance Bus Station.
- Exit B: Northwest side of Jiefang Avenue.
- Exit D: Southeast side of Jiefang Avenue.

== Transfers ==
Bus transfers to Route 3, 4, 211, 212, 232, 234, 509, 577, 615, 727 and 809 are available at Xinrong Station.
