= Xingang Line =

Future metro line in Wuhan, Hubei, China

Overview
- Other names: Line 34; Wuhan Intercity railway Line S5; Line 10 Phase 2 (planned name)
- Native name: 新港线
- Status: Under construction
- Owner: Wuhan Metro
- Locale: Wuhan, Hubei, China
- Stations: 5 (Phase 1); 11 (total, included Phase 2)

Service
- Type: Rapid transit, Suburban railway
- System: Wuhan Metro
- Operator: Wuhan Metro

Technical
- Line length: 10.9 km (6.8 mi) (Phase 1); 35 km (22 mi) (total, included Phase 2)
- Num of tracks: 2
- Operating speed: 120 km/h (75 mph)

The Xingang Line (Chinese: 新港线), also known as Line 34 or Wuhan Intercity railway Line S5 or Phase 2 of Line 10, is an under construction suburban metro line serving Wuhan, Hubei, China. The section from Wuhan Railway Station to Beiyangqiao is a part of Line 10 and Xingang Line will be temporarily through service via Line 10 once Phase 1 is completed. Once phase 2 of Xingang Line is completed, the section from Tiepuling to Beiyangqiao will be split off from Xingang Line and become a part of Line 10 with no through service and the two lines will become a single line.

== Overview ==
Phase 1 is 10.9 km (6.8 mi) long. All 5 stations are underground, of which 3.93 km (2.44 mi) is in Hongshan District, 2.02 km (1.26 mi) is in the East Lake administrative area and 4.95 km (3.08 mi) is in Qingshan District. Construction began on December 26, 2021, also known as Line 10. The Beiyangqiao-Baiyu Mountain section began construction on 22 December 2023.

Phase 2 is expected to commence construction in 2027.

== Stations ==
Section	Station name		Transfer	Distance km	Location
Section	English	Chinese	Transfer	Distance km	Location
Phase 2, known as Yangluo section	?	桃桥湖			?
Phase 2, known as Yangluo section	Shigang	施岗	Yangluo		Xinzhou
Phase 2, known as Yangluo section	?	阳逻之心			?
Phase 2, known as Yangluo section	?	柴泊湖			?
Phase 2, known as Yangluo section	?	阳逻街			?
Phase 2, known as Yangluo section	?	化工新区			?
Phase 1	Baiyu Mountain	白玉山			Qingshan
Phase 1	Wanjiazui	万家咀			Qingshan
Phase 1	Tiepuling	铁铺岭	10		Qingshan
Phase 1, operating under Line 10	Wuhan Railway Station	武汉火车站	4		Hongshan
Phase 1, operating under Line 10	Beiyangqiao	北洋桥			?
↓ Through service via Line 10 for Hankou Railway Station

== Rolling stock ==
The Beiyangqiao-Tiepuling section is expected to use 6-car type A rolling stock and the Tiepuling-Baiyu Mountain section is expected to use 4-car type A rolling stock.
