= Kongzihe Reservoir =

- Interactive map of Kongzihe Reservoir
- Location: Jiujie Street, Xinzhou District
- Coordinates: 30.786°N 114.913°E
- Purpose: irrigation, flood control
- Construction began: 1957

Kongzihe Reservoir (simplified Chinese: 孔子河水库; traditional Chinese: 孔子河水庫; pinyin: Kǒngzǐ hé shuǐkù), also known as Confucius River Reservoir, is a reservoir located at 3.5 km north of Jiujie Street, Xinzhou District, Wuhan City, Hubei Province, China. It is a small (I) reservoir mainly for irrigation, taking into account flood control, power generation, breeding and other comprehensive use. The reservoir mainly supplies water to Xugu, Jiujie, Daoguan, Zhucheng, Xinchong and other places.

The construction of Kongzihe Reservoir started in 1957, and was completed in 1964. It is one of the three major reservoirs in Xinzhou. The dam of the reservoir is 208 meters long, with a maximum height of 32 meters and a total storage capacity of 7.6 million m³.

Kongzihe Reservoir is also a scenic spot, part of the first phase of the Wenjin Education and Cultural Industrial Park.
