= Line 34 =

Line 34 may refer to:

- Line 34 (Beijing Subway), better known as the Capital Airport Express
- Line 34 (Wuhan Metro)
- RandstadRail line 34, light rail network in South Holland
