= Daoguanhe Reservoir =

- Interactive map of Daoguanhe Reservoir
- Location: Xinzhou, Hubei
- Coordinates: 30.865°N 115.003°E
- Construction began: October 1958

Daoguanhe Reservoir (simplified Chinese: 道观河水库; traditional Chinese: 道觀河水庫; pinyin: Dàoguàn hé shuǐkù), also known as Taoist Temple River Reservoir, is a large-sized reservoir in Xinzhou District, Wuhan City, Hubei Province, China, located on the Daoguan River, a tributary of the Sha River. It is mainly used for irrigation, taking into account flood control, power generation, farming and other comprehensive use.

Construction of the Daoguanhe Reservoir started in October 1958, and was completed in 1968. The average water depth of the reservoir is 10.3m, with a total storage capacity of 100 million cubic meters.
