= Yangluo Line =

Line of Wuhan Metro

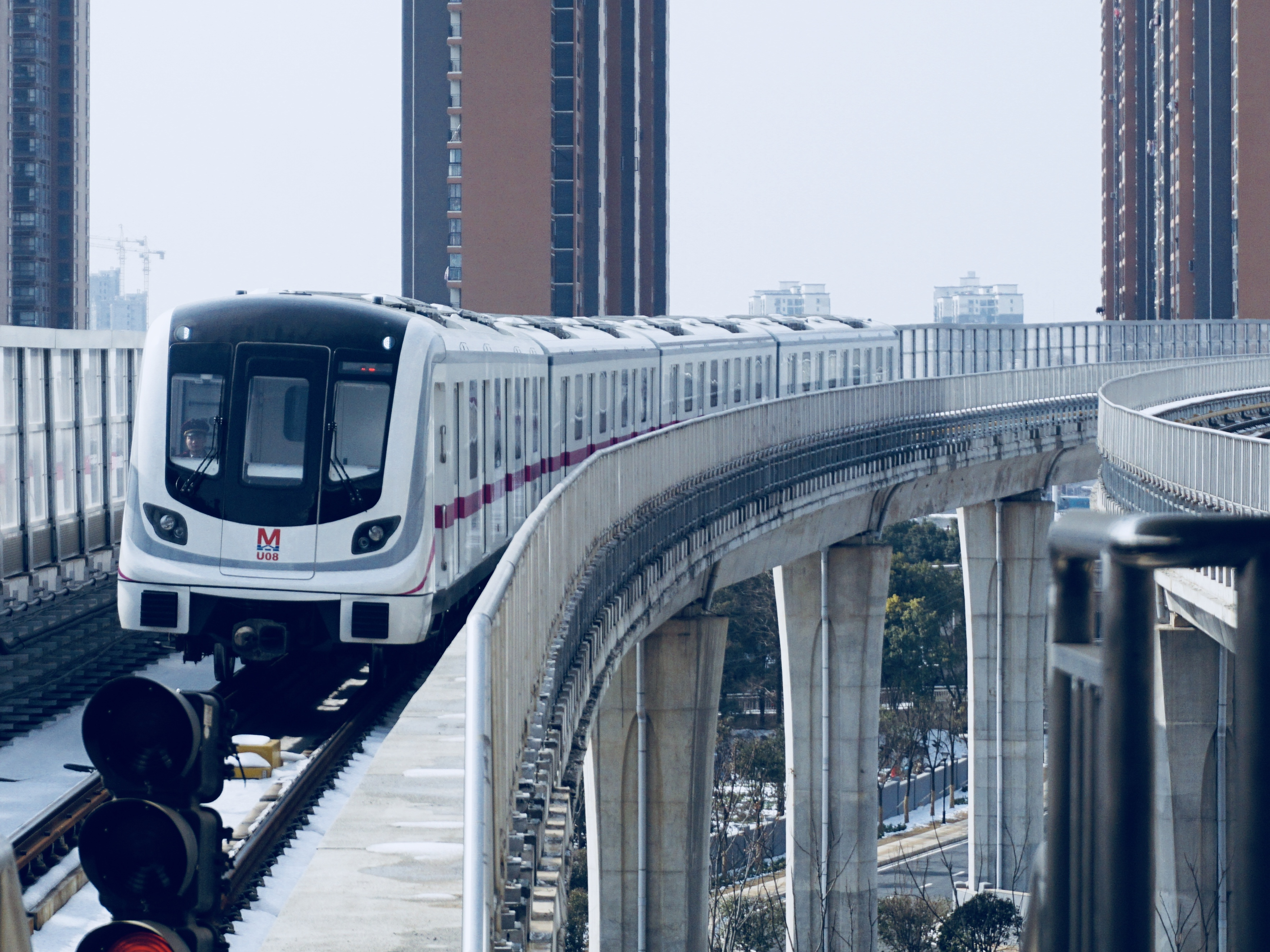

Overview
- Other name: Line 21
- Native name: 阳逻线
- Status: Operational
- Owner: Wuhan
- Locale: Wuhan, Hubei
- Termini: Zhongyi Road; Jintai
- Stations: 18

Service
- Type: Rapid transit
- System: Wuhan Metro
- Operator: Wuhan Metro Group Co., Ltd.
- Rolling stock: CRRC Zhuzhou Locomotive Chinese Type A

History
- Opened: 26 December 2017; 8 years ago

Technical
- Line length: 38.12 km (23.69 mi)
- Number of tracks: 2
- Character: Underground and Elevated
- Track gauge: 1,435 mm (4 ft 8 1/2 in)

Map of Yangluo Line

The Yangluo Line (Chinese: 阳逻线), also known as Line 21 (武汉轨道交通21号线) of Wuhan Metro is a suburban metro line in Wuhan, Hubei Province, China. The line was opened on 26 December 2017.

It is the seventh line of the Wuhan Metro to be opened since its creation.

== History ==
| Segment | Commencement | Length | Station(s) | Name |
|---|---|---|---|---|
| Houhu Boulevard — Jintai | 26 December 2017 | 34.575 km (21.48 mi) | 16 | Phase 1 |
| Zhongyi Road — Houhu Boulevard | 29 October 2026 | 3.12 km (1.94 mi) | 2 | Line 12 connecting line |

== Stations ==
| Station name | | Connections | Distance km | | Location |
| English | Chinese | Connections | Distance km | | Location |
|---|---|---|---|---|---|
| Zhongyi Road | 中一路 | 8 12 | | | Jiang'an |
| Xinchun | 新春 | | | | Jiang'an |
| Houhu Boulevard | 后湖大道 | 3 | 0.000 | 0.000 | Jiang'an |
| Baibutinghuayuan Road | 百步亭花园路 | | 0.985 | 0.985 | Jiang'an |
| Xinrong (Note: formerly Xinrong Long-Distance Bus station (新荣客运站), transfer gateway opened on 30 December 2022 and hence renamed to match line 1 station name.) | 新荣 | 1 | 1.759 | 2.744 | Jiang'an |
| Xingfuwan | 幸福湾 | | 2.042 | 4.786 | Jiang'an |
| Zhujiahe | 朱家河 | | 2.351 | 7.137 | Jiang'an |
| Shenjiaji | 谌家矶 | | 0.881 | 8.018 | Jiang'an |
| Qinglong | 青龙 | | 3.164 | 11.182 | Huangpi |
| Gaoche | 高车 | | 2.294 | 13.476 | Huangpi |
| Wuhu | 武湖 | | 2.230 | 15.706 | Huangpi |
| Shakou | 沙口 | | 4.628 | 20.334 | Huangpi |
| Junmincun | 军民村 | | 3.785 | 24.119 | Xinzhou |
| Wuhan Bioengineering Institute | 武生院 | | 1.018 | 25.137 | Xinzhou |
| Yangluo | 阳逻 | | 2.787 | 27.924 | Xinzhou |
| Yangluo Development Zone | 阳逻开发区 | | 1.460 | 29.384 | Xinzhou |
| Shigang | 施岗 | 34 | 3.232 | 32.616 | Xinzhou |
| Jintai | 金台 | | 1.959 | 34.575 | Xinzhou |
