= Jiang'an, Wuhan =

Jiang'an 江岸区
- District
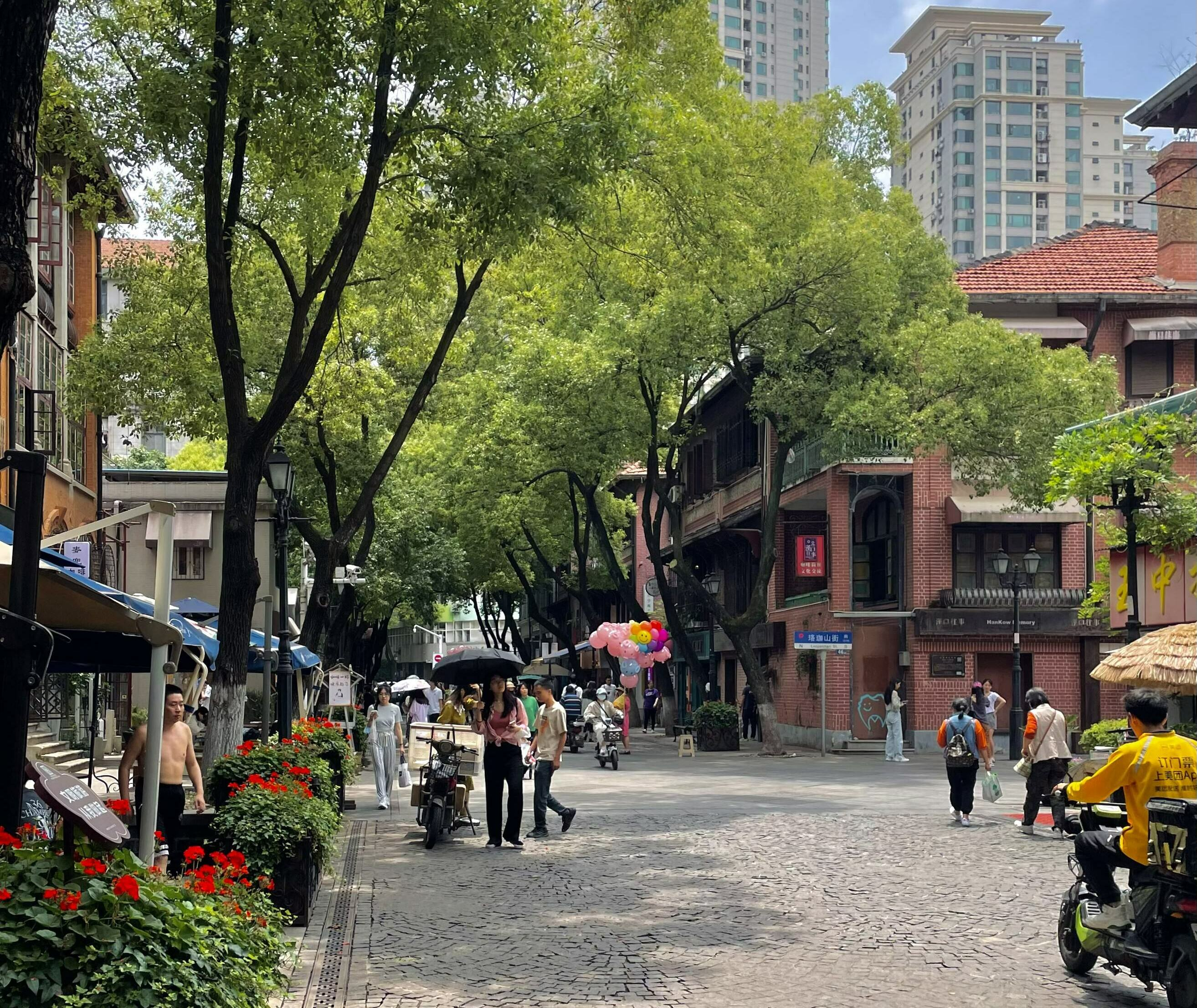
- Foreign concession area of Wuhan
- Interactive map of Jiang'an
- Location in Hubei
- Coordinates: 30°38′11″N 114°19′49″E
- Country: China
- Province: Hubei
- Sub-provincial city: Wuhan
- District seat: Tazihu Subdistrict

Area
  - Total: 64.24 km^{2} (24.80 sq mi)

Population (2020 census)
  - Total: 965,260
  - Density: 15,030/km^{2} (38,920/sq mi)
- Time zone: UTC+8 (China Standard)
- Website: www.jiangan.gov.cn

Jiang'an District (Chinese: 江岸区; pinyin: Jiāng'àn Qū) forms part of the urban core of and is one of 13 urban districts of the prefecture-level city of Wuhan, the capital of Hubei Province, China.

Jiang'an District is located on the Yangtze's left (northwestern) shore, and includes the northeastern half of the former Hankou city (northeast, i.e. downstream, of Jianghan Rd.). On the left bank of the Yangtze, it borders Huangpi to the north, Jianghan to the southwest, and Dongxihu to the west; on the opposite bank it borders Hongshan, Wuchang, and Qingshan.

== History ==
The American Congressional-Executive Commission on China included Jiang Yanchun (姜艳春), a 46-year-old native of Huarong District, Ezhou, in their Political Prisoner Database from November 5, 2017. Jiang was a petitioner who was contesting demolition and resettlement in Jiang'an District when she was detained in Beijing at around 4 PM on Sunday, November 13, 2016 for disrupting order in the Tian'anmen area. She was returned to Wuhan on November 14, 2016 where she was detained for ten days and then detained again for most of December for "picking quarrels and provoking trouble", which was seen as an arbitrary detention. She was released on bail on December 29, 2016.

== Administrative divisions ==
Jiang'an District administers 16 subdistricts and 1 residential community:

- Dazhi Subdistrict (大智街道)
- Yiyuan Subdistrict
- Chezhan Subdistrict (车站街道)
- Siwei Subdistrict (四唯街道)
- Yongqing Subdistrict (永清街道)
- Xima Subdistrict (西马街道)
- Qiuchang Subdistrict (球场街道)
- Laodong Subdistrict (劳动街道)
- Erqi Subdistrict (二七街道)
- Xincun Subdistrict (新村街道)
- Danshuichi Subdistrict (丹水池街道)
- Taibei Subdistrict (台北街道)
- Huaqiao Subdistrict (花桥街道)
- Shenjiaji Subdistrict (谌家矶街道)
- Houhu Subdistrict (后湖街道)
- Tazihu Subdistrict (塔子湖街道)
- Baibutinghuayuan Residential Community (百步亭花园社区)
