= Jintai station =

Metro station in Wuhan, China

Jintai 金台
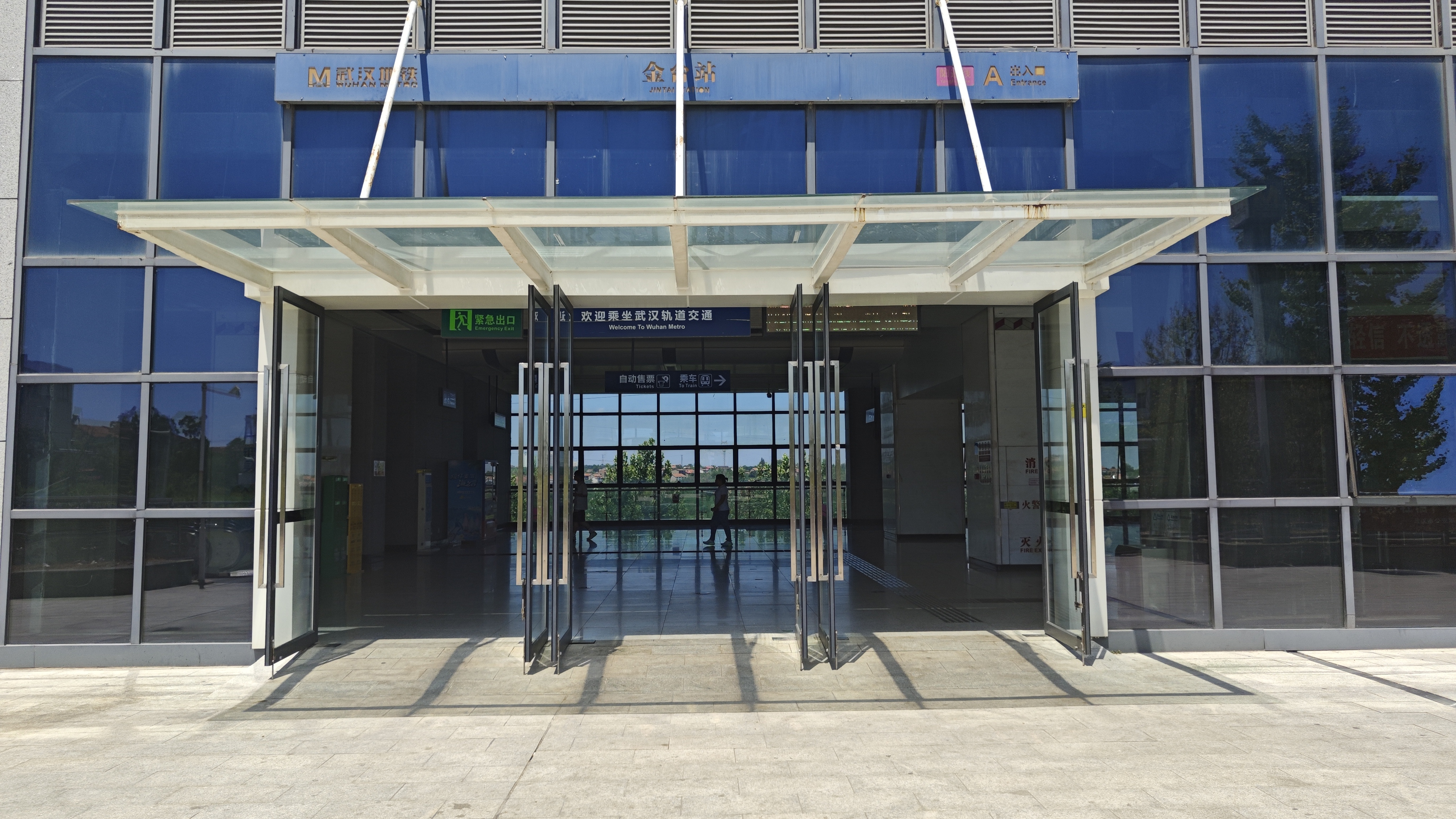
- Entrance A

General information
- Location: Xinzhou District, Wuhan, Hubei; China
- Operator: Wuhan Metro Co., Ltd
- Line: Yangluo Line
- Platforms: 2 (1 island platform)

Construction
- Structure type: Elevated

History
- Opened: December 26, 2017 (Yangluo Line)

Services
Preceding station	Wuhan Metro	Following station
Shigang towards Zhongyi Road	Yangluo Line	Terminus
Location

Jintai Station (Chinese: 金台站) is a station on the Yangluo Line of the Wuhan Metro. It entered revenue service on December 26, 2017. It is located in Xinzhou District and it is the eastern terminus of the Yangluo Line.

== Station layout ==
3F	Westbound	← Yangluo Line towards Zhongyi Road (Shigang)
3F	Island platform, doors will open on the left
3F	Eastbound	Yangluo Line termination platform →
2F	Concourse	Faregates, Station Agent
G	Entrances and Exits
