= Zhongyi Road station =

Metro station in Wuhan, China

Zhongyi Road 中一路 metro
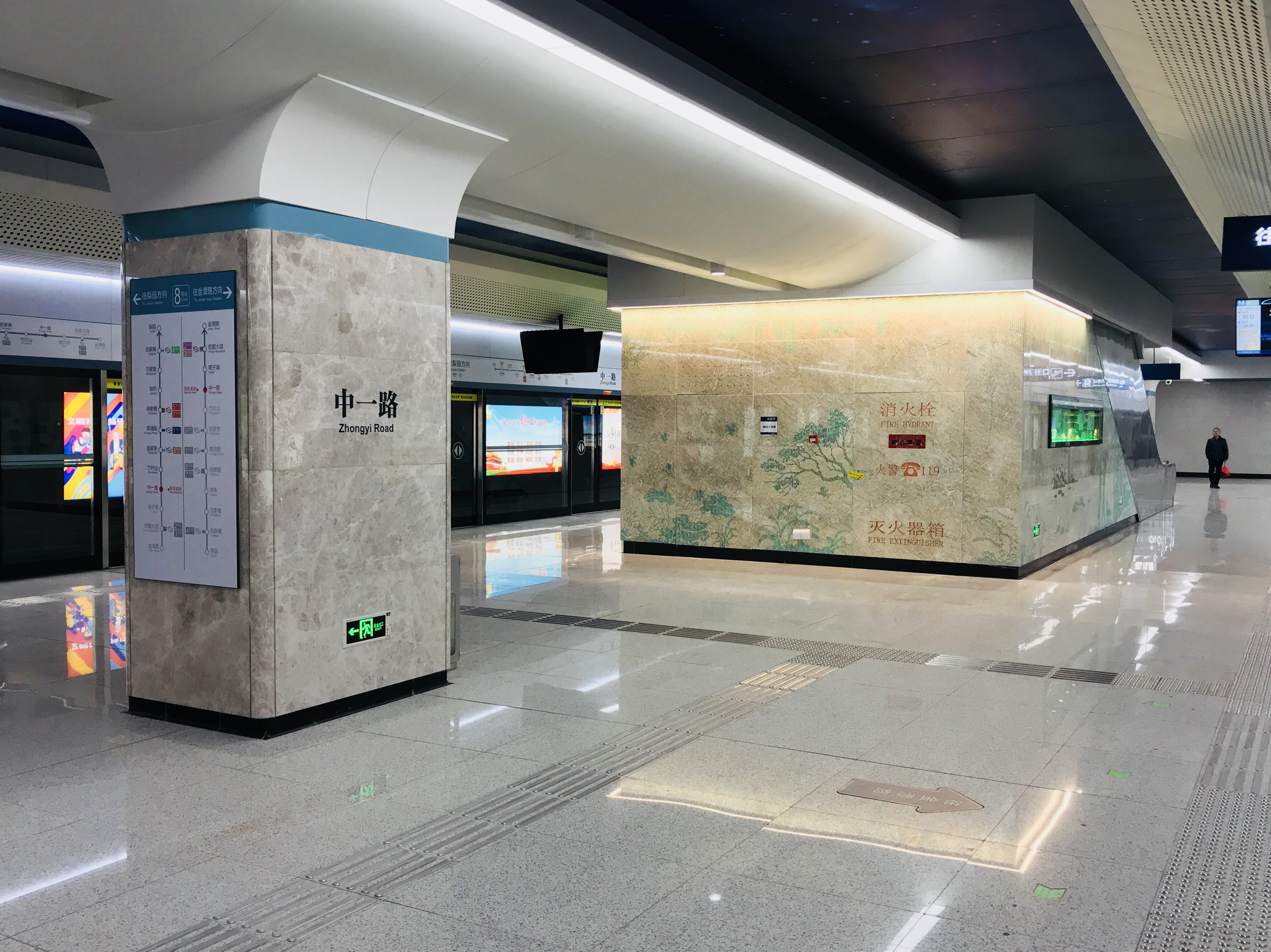

General information
- Location: Jiang'an District, Wuhan, Hubei; China
- Coordinates: 30.642654°N 114.275594°E
- Operator: Wuhan Metro Co., Ltd
- Lines: Line 8 Line 12; Yangluo Line
- Platforms: 2 (1 island platform)

Construction
- Structure type: Underground

History
- Opened: December 26, 2017 (Line 8); October 29, 2026 (Line 12 and Yangluo Line)

Services
Preceding station	Wuhan Metro	Following station
Tazihu towards Jintan Road	Line 8	Zhuyeshan towards Military Athletes' Village
Shiqiao Outer Circle	Line 12	Houhu 4th Road Inner Circle
Terminus	Yangluo Line	Xinchun towards Jintai
Location

Zhongyi Road Station (Chinese: 中一路站) is a station on Line 8, Line 12 and Yangluo Line of the Wuhan Metro. It entered revenue service on December 26, 2017. It is located in Jiang'an District.

== Station layout ==
G	Entrances and Exits
B1	Concourse	Faregates, Station Agent
B2	Northbound	← Line 8 towards Jintan Road (Tazihu)
B2	Island platform, doors will open on the left
B2	Southbound	Line 8 towards Military Athletes' Village (Zhuyeshan) →
B3	Outer Circle	← Line 12 Outer Circle (Shiqiao)
B3	Island platform, doors will open on the left
B3	Westbound	Yangluo Line termination platform ←
B3	Eastbound	Yangluo Line towards Jintai (Xinchun) →
B3	Island platform, doors will open on the left
B3	Inner Circle	Line 12 Inner Circle (Houhu 4th Road) →

== Gallery ==
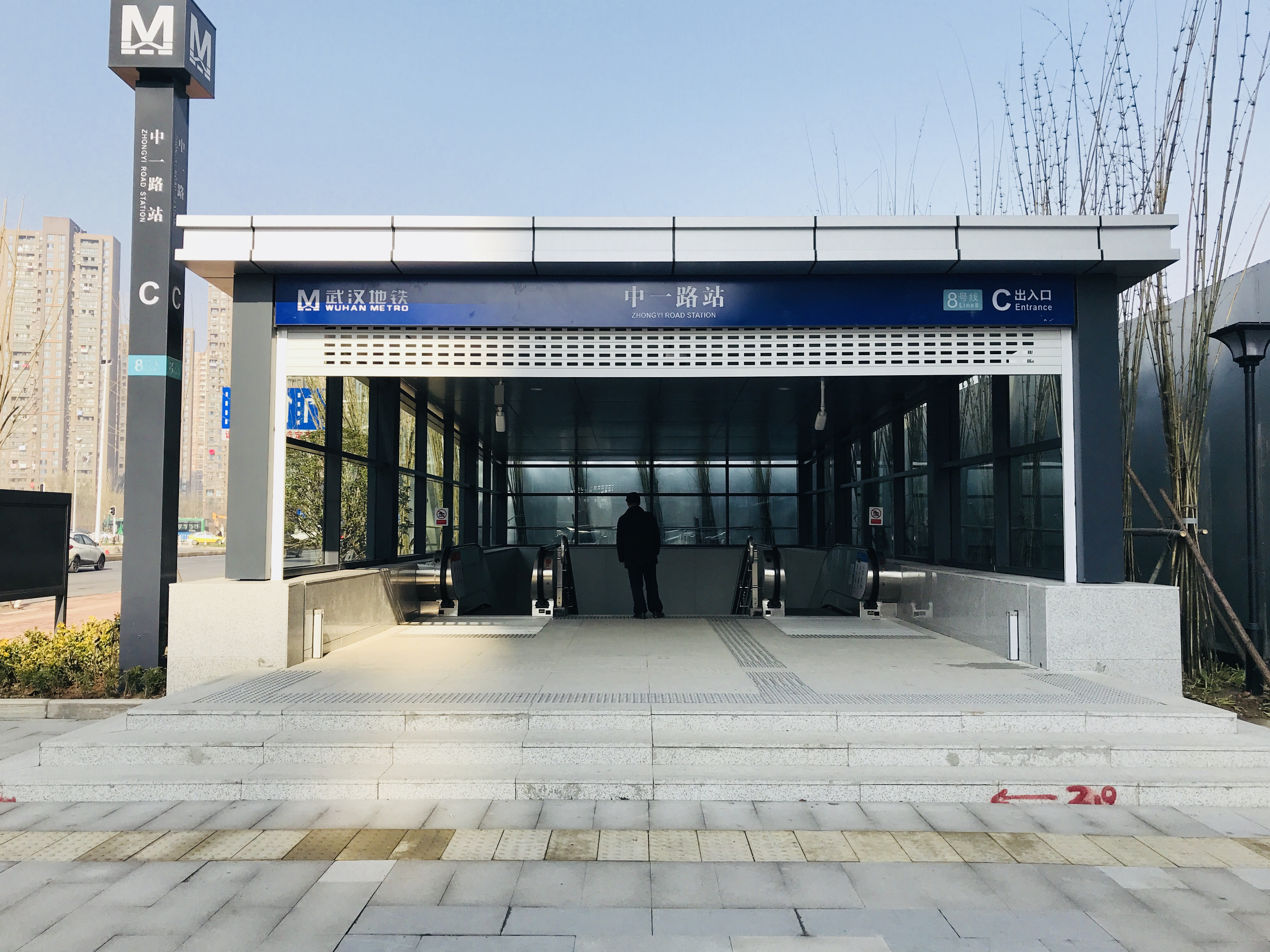
Entrance C

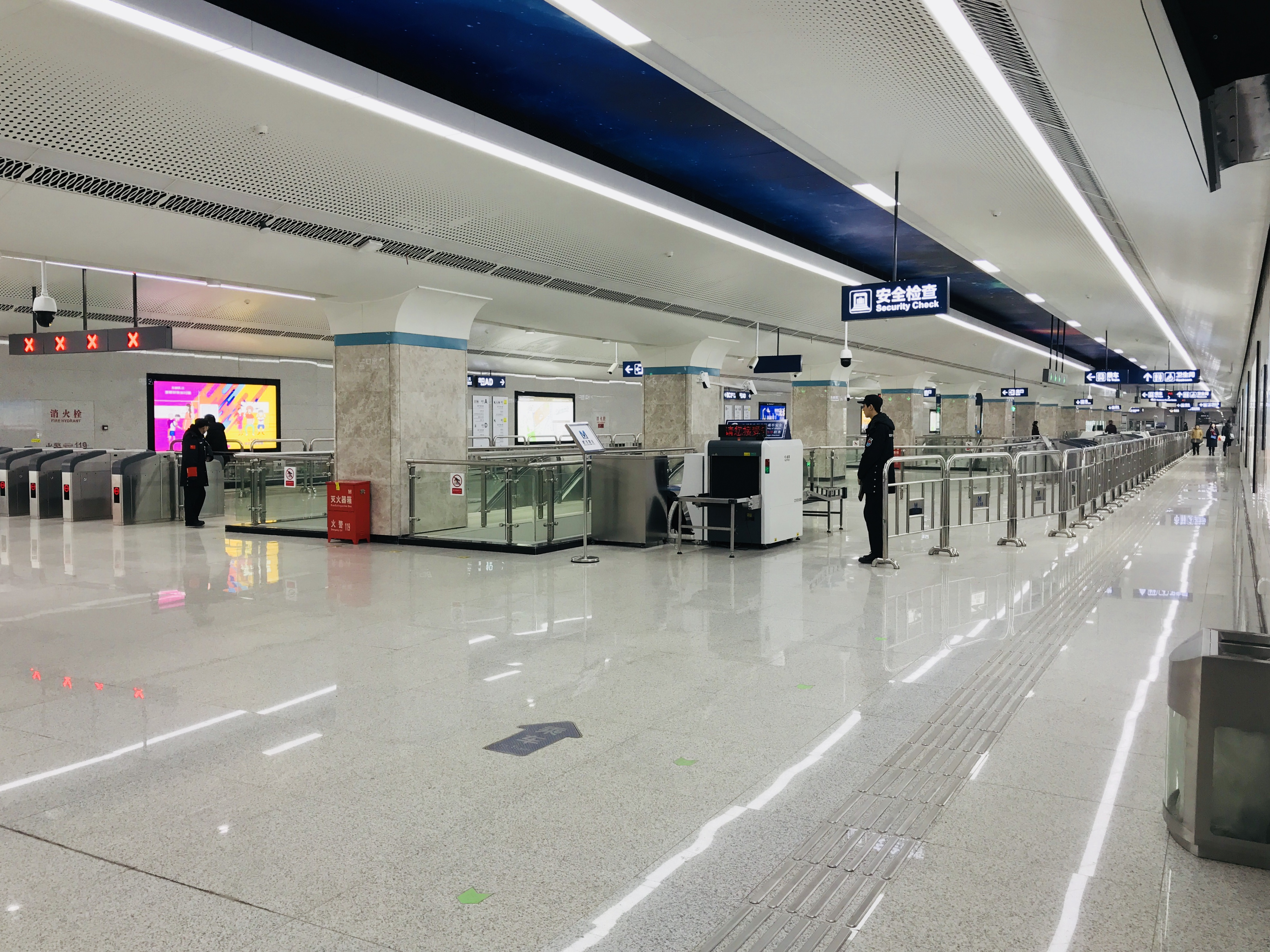
Concourse

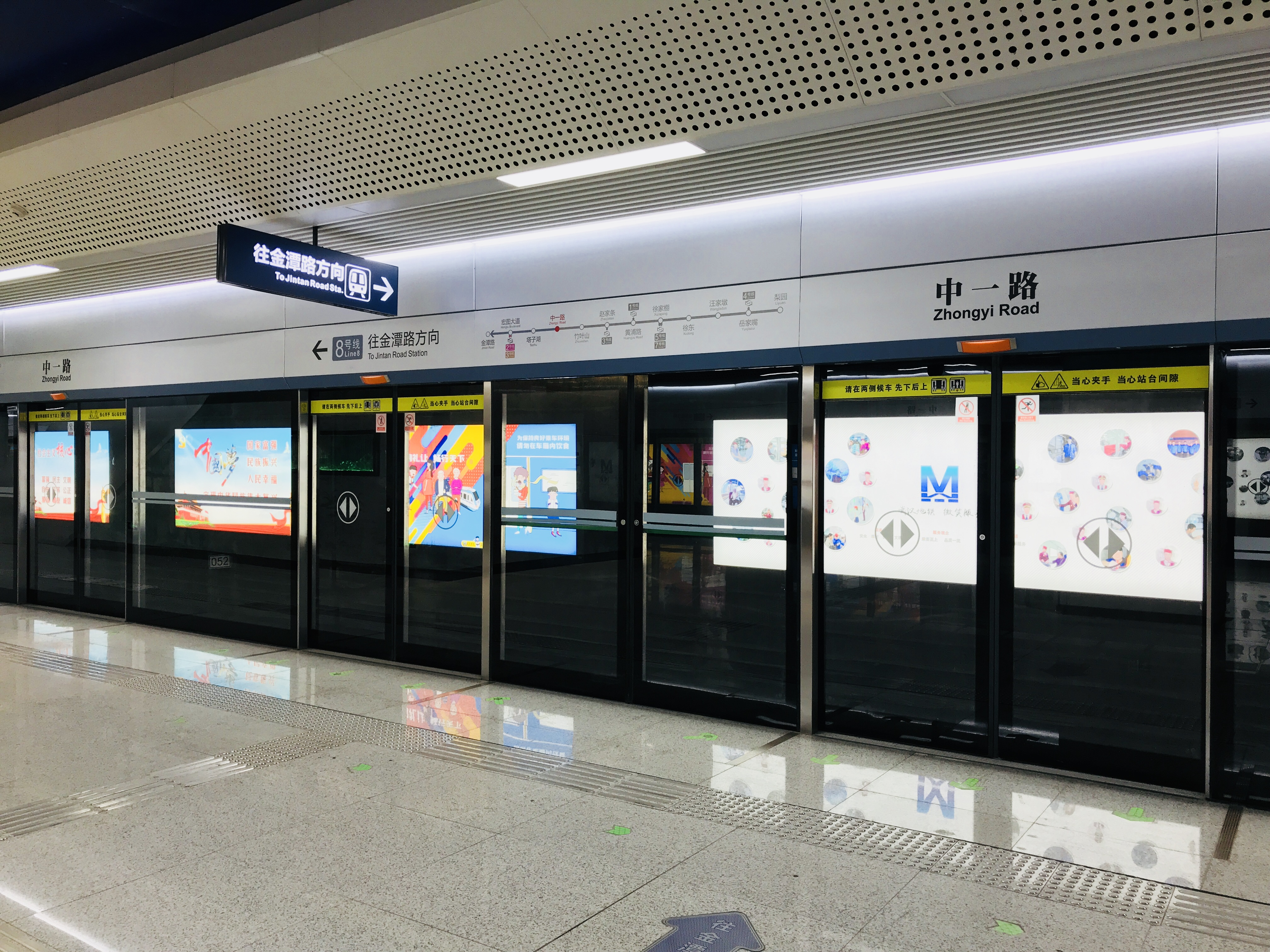
Platform
