= Xinzhou, Wuhan =

Xinzhou 新洲区
- District
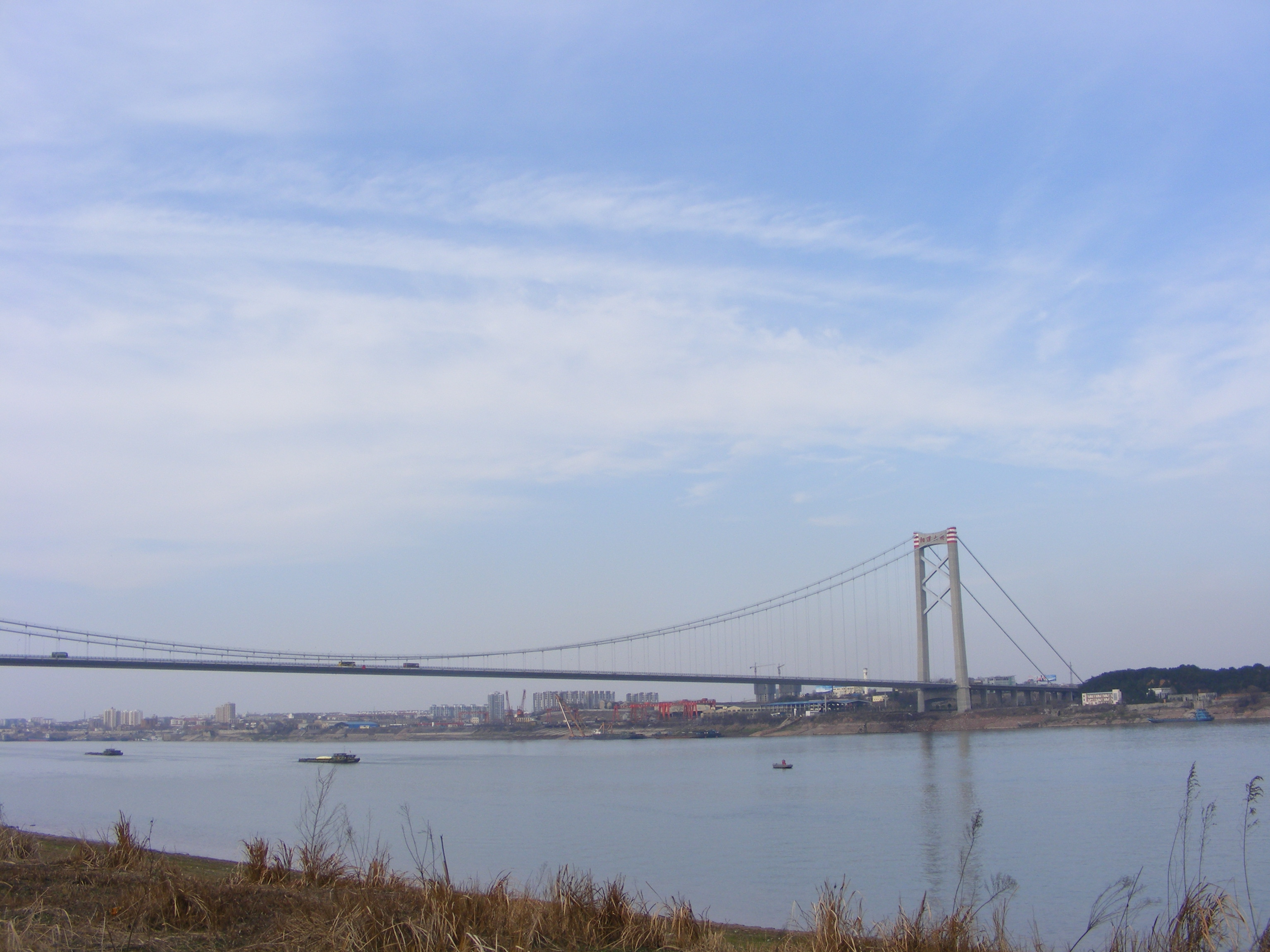
- Yangluo Yangtze River Bridge

- Location in Hubei
- Coordinates: 30°50′08″N 114°47′08″E
- Country: People's Republic of China
- Province: Hubei
- Sub-provincial city: Wuhan

Area
  - Total: 1,500.00 km^{2} (579.15 sq mi)

Population (2020)
  - Total: 860,377
  - Density: 573.585/km^{2} (1,485.58/sq mi)
- Time zone: UTC+8 (China Standard)
- Postal code: 4314XX
- Website: http://www.whxinzhou.gov.cn/

Xinzhou (Chinese: 新洲; pinyin: Xīnzhōu) is one of 13 urban districts of the prefecture-level city of Wuhan, the capital of Hubei Province, China, covering part of the city's northeastern suburbs and situated on the northern (left) bank of the Yangtze River. It is also the easternmost of Wuhan's districts. It borders the districts of Hongshan to the southwest and Huangpi to the west, as well as the prefecture-level cities of Huanggang to the north and east and Ezhou to the south.

The Wuhan Yangluo Airfield (武汉阳逻机场) is located in Xinzhou District.

== History ==
In 1951, "Gangxi" (岗西) was separated from Huanggang County, and Xinzhou County was established in the name of Xinzhou Town in the area, and the county seat Xinzhou Town was renamed Chengguan Town (城关镇).

In 1983, Xinzhou County was transferred from the Huanggang area to Wuhan City.

In 1998, the county was abolished to establish Xinzhou District of Wuhan City, and the district seat Chengguan Town was renamed to the Zhucheng Subdistrict.

In early July 2019, there were protests against plans for a new incinerator in Yangluo Subdistrict.

== Geography ==
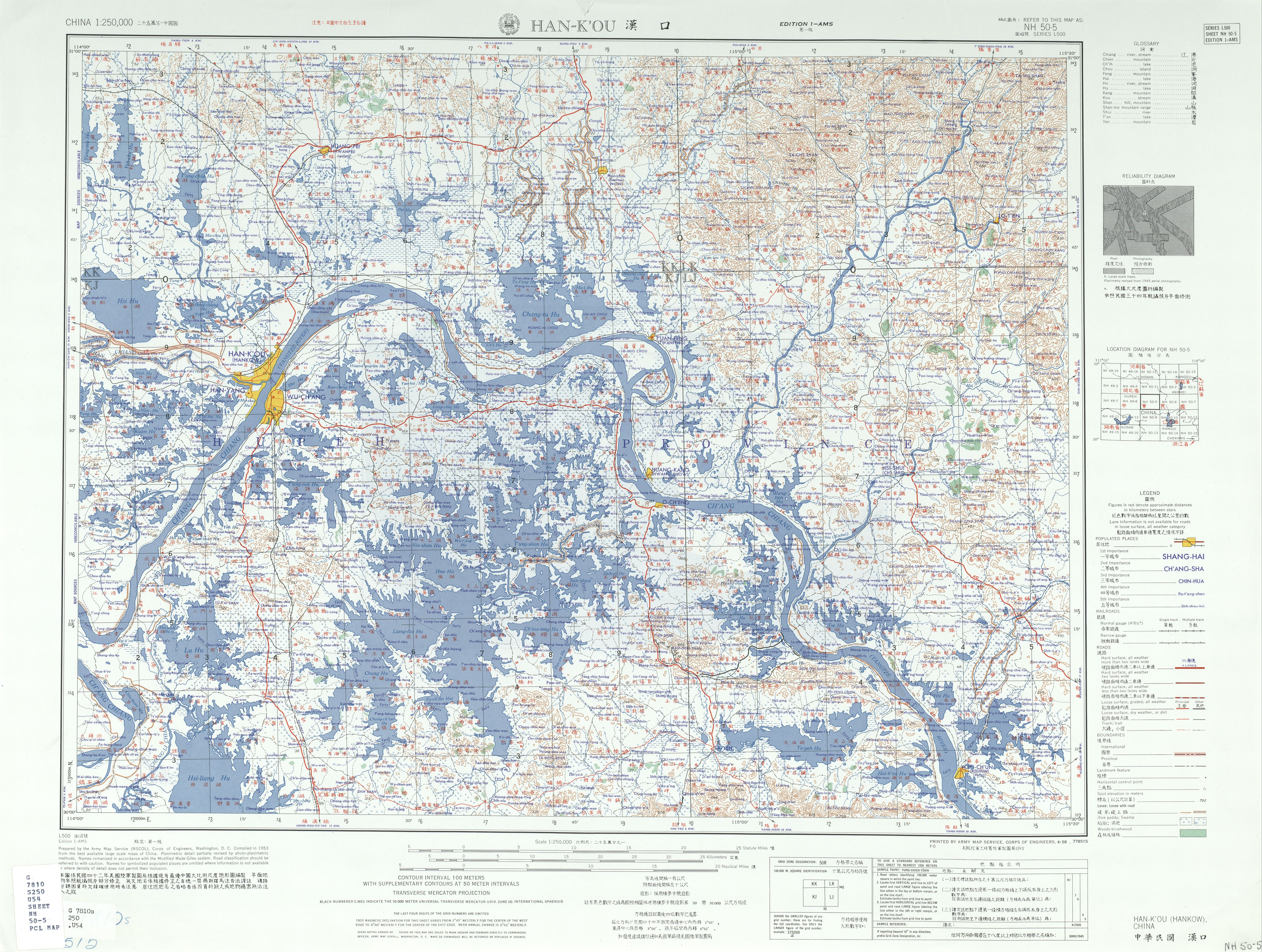
Map including Xinzhou (labeled as Hsin-chou (Sinchow) (walled) 新洲) (1953)

=== Administrative divisions ===
Xinzhou District administers:

Name	Chinese (S)
Zhucheng Subdistrict	邾城街道
Yangluo Subdistrict	阳逻街道
Cangbu Subdistrict	仓埠街道
Wangji Subdistrict	汪集街道
Liji Subdistrict	李集街道
Sandian Subdistrict	三店街道
Pantang Subdistrict	潘塘街道
Jiujie Subdistrict	旧街街道
Shuangliu Subdistrict	双柳街道
Zhangduhu Subdistrict	涨渡湖街道
Xinchong Subdistrict	辛冲街道
Xugu Subdistrict	徐古街道
Fenghuang Township	凤凰镇
Daoguanhe Office	道观河风景旅游管理处
Yangluo Development Zone	阳逻开发区

== Climate ==
Climate data for Xinzhou, elevation 41 m (135 ft), (1991–2020 normals, extremes 1981–present)
Month	Jan	Feb	Mar	Apr	May	Jun	Jul	Aug	Sep	Oct	Nov	Dec	Year
Record high °C (°F)	20.8 (69.4)	27.5 (81.5)	34.8 (94.6)	33.1 (91.6)	35.7 (96.3)	37.5 (99.5)	39.7 (103.5)	40.3 (104.5)	37.4 (99.3)	35.2 (95.4)	30.0 (86.0)	23.1 (73.6)	40.3 (104.5)
Mean daily maximum °C (°F)	8.4 (47.1)	11.6 (52.9)	16.3 (61.3)	22.7 (72.9)	27.4 (81.3)	30.2 (86.4)	33.1 (91.6)	33.0 (91.4)	29.2 (84.6)	23.7 (74.7)	17.4 (63.3)	11.0 (51.8)	22.0 (71.6)
Daily mean °C (°F)	4.0 (39.2)	6.8 (44.2)	11.3 (52.3)	17.5 (63.5)	22.5 (72.5)	25.9 (78.6)	28.8 (83.8)	28.3 (82.9)	24.0 (75.2)	18.1 (64.6)	11.8 (53.2)	5.9 (42.6)	17.1 (62.7)
Mean daily minimum °C (°F)	0.8 (33.4)	3.3 (37.9)	7.4 (45.3)	13.2 (55.8)	18.4 (65.1)	22.4 (72.3)	25.4 (77.7)	24.7 (76.5)	20.1 (68.2)	14.1 (57.4)	7.8 (46.0)	2.3 (36.1)	13.3 (56.0)
Record low °C (°F)	−10.4 (13.3)	−7.9 (17.8)	−3.5 (25.7)	2.4 (36.3)	8.2 (46.8)	12.6 (54.7)	19.0 (66.2)	16.8 (62.2)	10.1 (50.2)	3.7 (38.7)	−2.9 (26.8)	−11.5 (11.3)	−11.5 (11.3)
Average precipitation mm (inches)	49.2 (1.94)	62.5 (2.46)	90.6 (3.57)	134.9 (5.31)	159.4 (6.28)	214.1 (8.43)	239.1 (9.41)	102.1 (4.02)	76.7 (3.02)	62.6 (2.46)	56.4 (2.22)	30.4 (1.20)	1,278 (50.32)
Average precipitation days (≥ 0.1 mm)	9.4	10.2	12.7	11.3	11.9	11.9	11.2	9.1	7.4	8.6	8.9	7.0	119.6
Average snowy days	3.7	2.0	0.7	0	0	0	0	0	0	0	0.4	1.4	8.2
Average relative humidity (%)	76	76	75	75	76	81	81	79	77	76	76	73	77
Mean monthly sunshine hours	109.8	108.1	136.8	167.4	180.4	171.0	218.8	230.1	185.0	164.3	143.1	129.1	1,943.9
Percentage possible sunshine	34	34	37	43	42	41	51	57	51	47	45	41	44
Source: China Meteorological Administration

== Transport ==
Xinzhou District is served by Yangluo Line (Line 21) of Wuhan Metro.
