= Taipingyang station =

Wuhan Metro station

Taipingyang 太平洋 metro
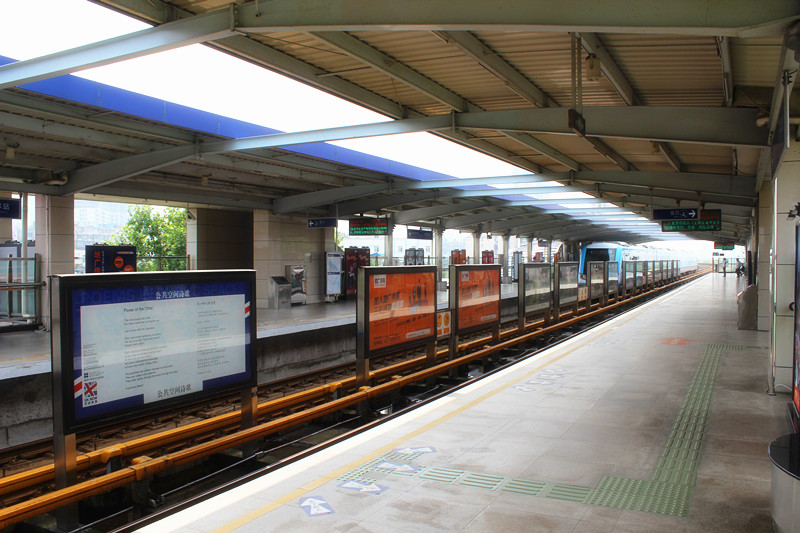

General information
- Location: Qiaokou District, Wuhan, Hubei; China
- Coordinates: 30°34′36″N 114°14′07″E
- Operated by: Wuhan Metro Co., Ltd
- Line: Line 1
- Platforms: 2 (2 side platforms)

Construction
- Structure type: Elevated

History
- Opened: April 8, 2006; 20 years ago

Services
Preceding station	Wuhan Metro	Following station
Zongguan towards Jinghe	Line 1	Qiaokou Road towards Hankou North
Location

Taipingyang Station (Chinese: 太平洋站), or literally Pacific Ocean Station, is a station of Line 1 of Wuhan Metro. It entered revenue service on April 8, 2006. It is located in Qiaokou District.

The station named "Taipingyang" because there is a soap factory which named "Taipingyang" (literally "Pacific Ocean").

== Station layout ==
3F	Side platform, doors open on the right
3F	Westbound	← Line 1 towards Jinghe (Zongguan)
3F	Eastbound	Line 1 towards Hankou North (Qiaokou Road) →
3F	Side platform, doors open on the right
2F	Concourse	Faregates, Station Agent
G	Entrances and Exits

== Transfers ==
Bus transfers to Route 1, 2, 5, 46, 56, 208, 622 and 712 are available at Taipingyang Station.
