= Zhuyehai station =

Wuhan Metro station

Zhuyehai 竹叶海 metro
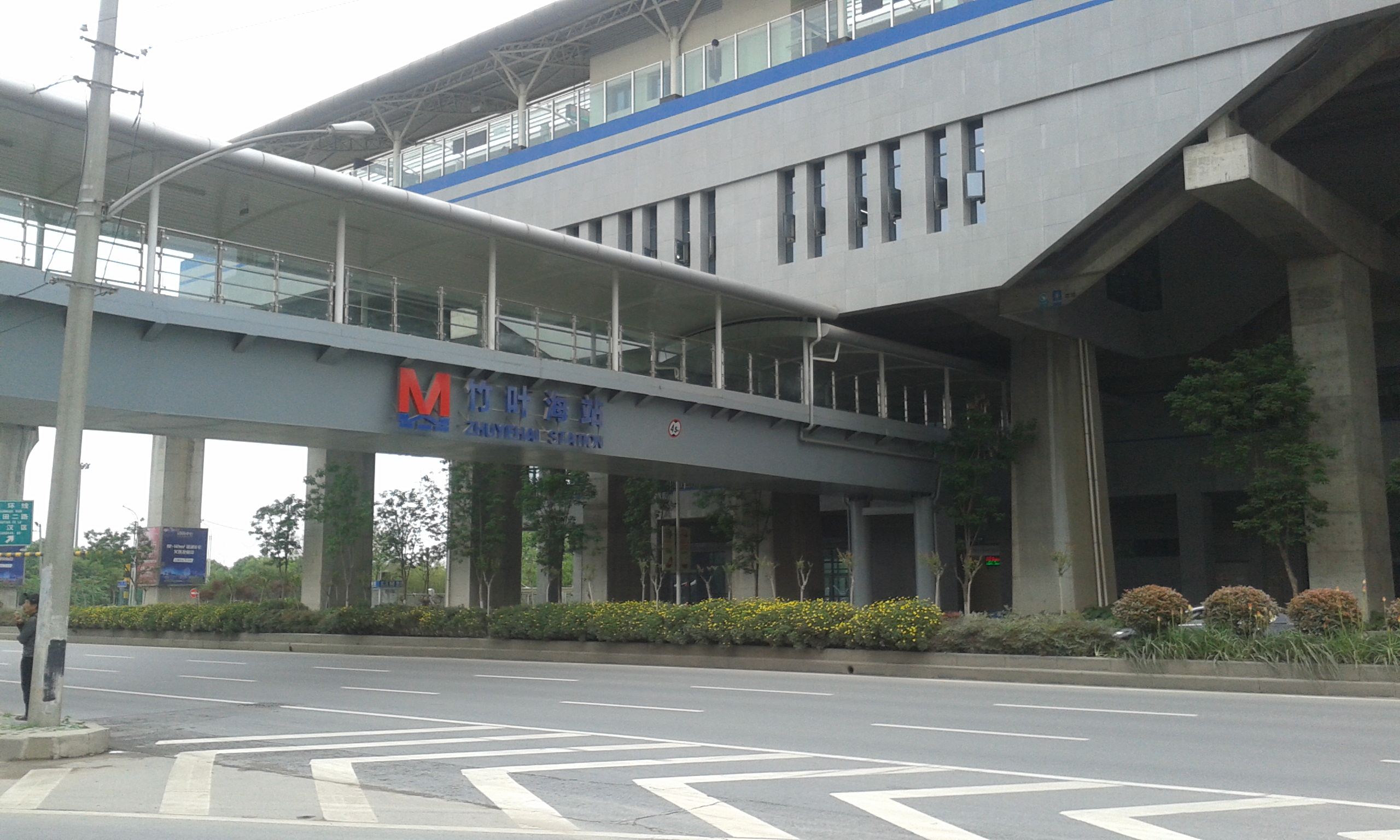

General information
- Location: Qiaokou District, Wuhan, Hubei; China
- Coordinates: 30°36′56″N 114°09′47″E
- Operated by: Wuhan Metro Co., Ltd
- Line: Line 1
- Platforms: 2 (2 side platforms)

Construction
- Structure type: Elevated

History
- Opened: September 17, 2014; 11 years ago (Line 1)

Services
Preceding station	Wuhan Metro	Following station
Etouwan towards Jinghe	Line 1	Duoluokou towards Hankou North
Location

Zhuyehai station (Chinese: 竹叶海站; pinyin: Zhúyèhǎi zhàn) is a station of Line 1 of Wuhan Metro. It opened on September 17, 2014. It is located in Qiaokou District.

== Near the station ==
- IKEA store

== Station layout ==
3F	Side platform, doors open on the right
3F	Westbound	← Line 1 towards Jinghe (Etouwan)
3F	Eastbound	Line 1 towards Hankou North (Duoluokou) →
3F	Side platform, doors open on the right
2F	Concourse	Faregates, Station Agent
G	Entrances and Exits	Exits A-C

== Transfers ==
Bus transfers to Route 218, 222, 505, 546, 560, 621, 736, 737, 741 are available at Zhuyehai station.

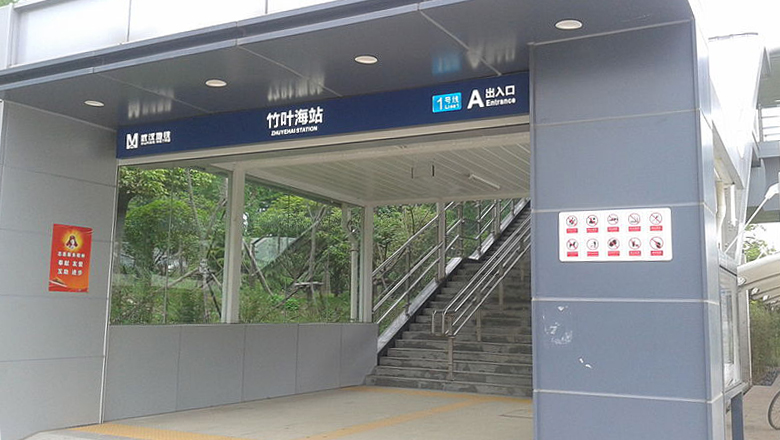
Entrance A

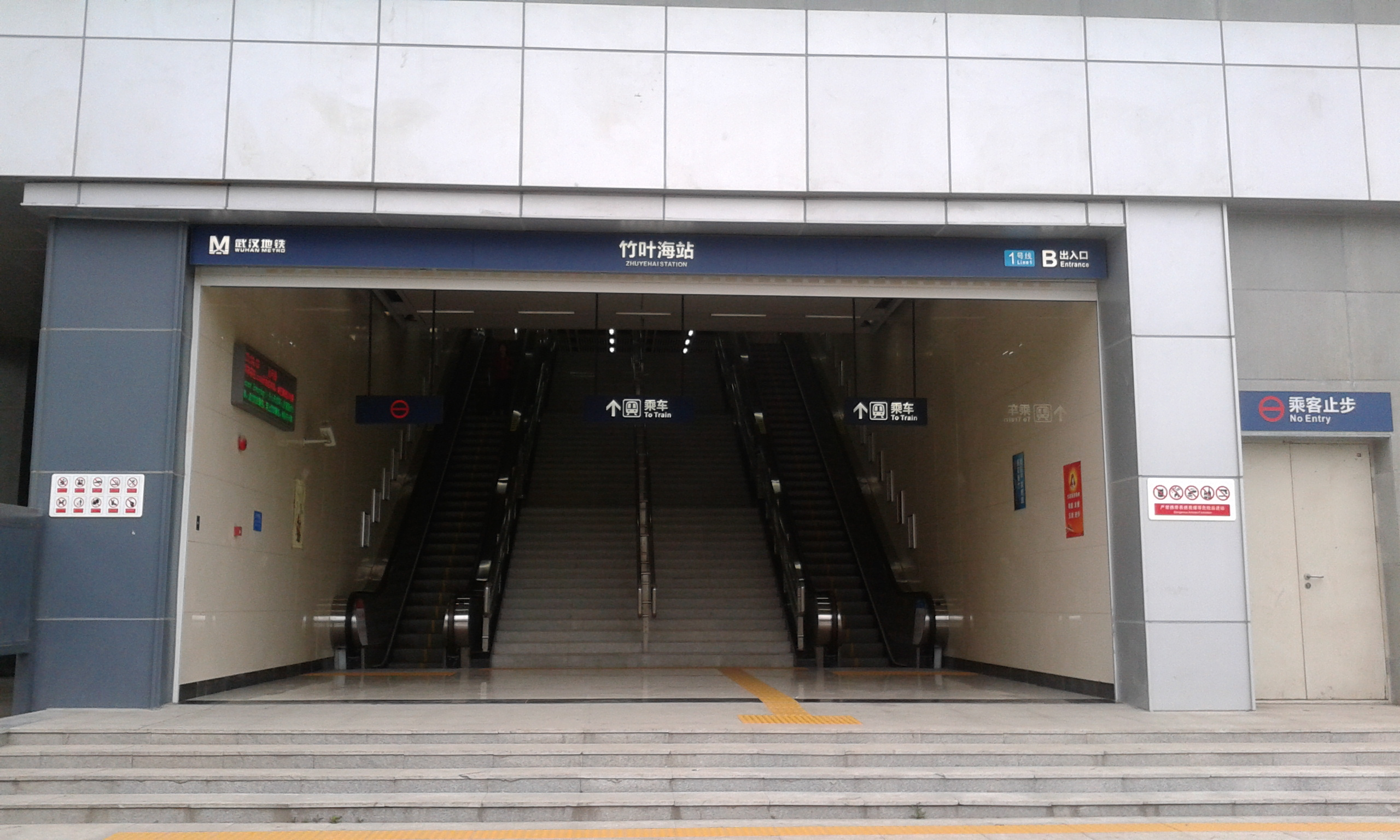
Entrance B

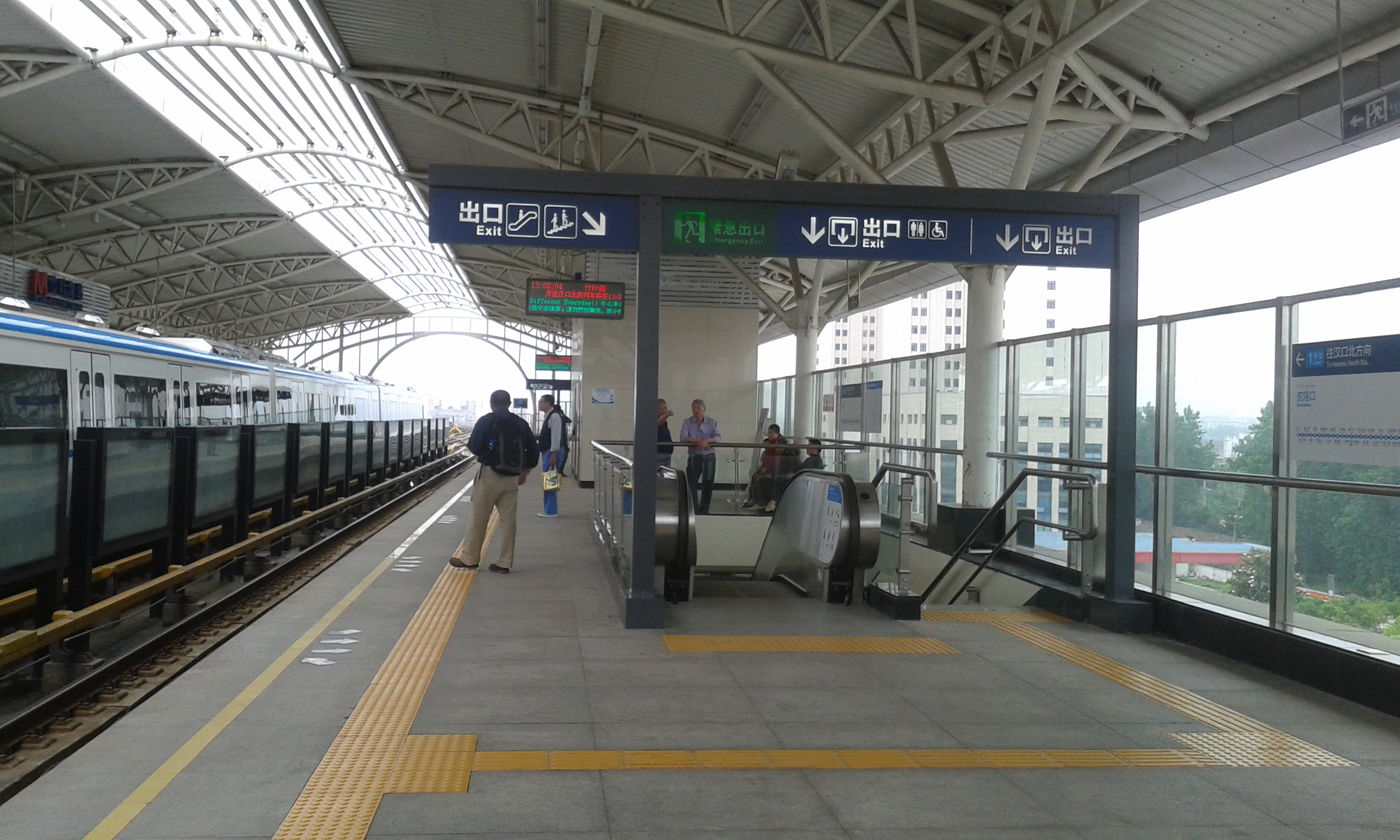
Platform
