= Hanxi 1st Road station =

Wuhan Metro station

Hanxi 1st Road 汉西一路 metro

General information
- Location: Qiaokou District, Wuhan, Hubei; China
- Coordinates: 30°35′04″N 114°13′13″E
- Operated by: Wuhan Metro Co., Ltd
- Line: Line 1
- Platforms: 2 (2 side platforms)

Construction
- Structure type: Elevated

History
- Opened: July 29, 2010; 15 years ago (Line 1)

Services
Preceding station	Wuhan Metro	Following station
Gutian 4th Road towards Jinghe	Line 1	Zongguan towards Hankou North
Location

Hanxi 1st Road Station (Chinese: 汉西一路站) is a station of Line 1 of Wuhan Metro. It entered revenue service on July 29, 2010. It is located in Qiaokou District.

== Station layout ==
3F	Side platform, doors open on the right
3F	Westbound	← Line 1 towards Jinghe (Gutian 4th Road)
3F	Eastbound	Line 1 towards Hankou North (Zongguan) →
3F	Side platform, doors open on the right
2F	Concourse	Faregates, Station Agent
G	Entrances and Exits

== Transfers ==
Bus transfers to Route 2, 222, 505, 508, 512, 531, 546, 548, 550, 558, 560, 621, 737, 741 and 806 are available at Hanxi 1st Road Station.
