= Zongguan station =

Wuhan Metro station

Zongguan 宗关 metro
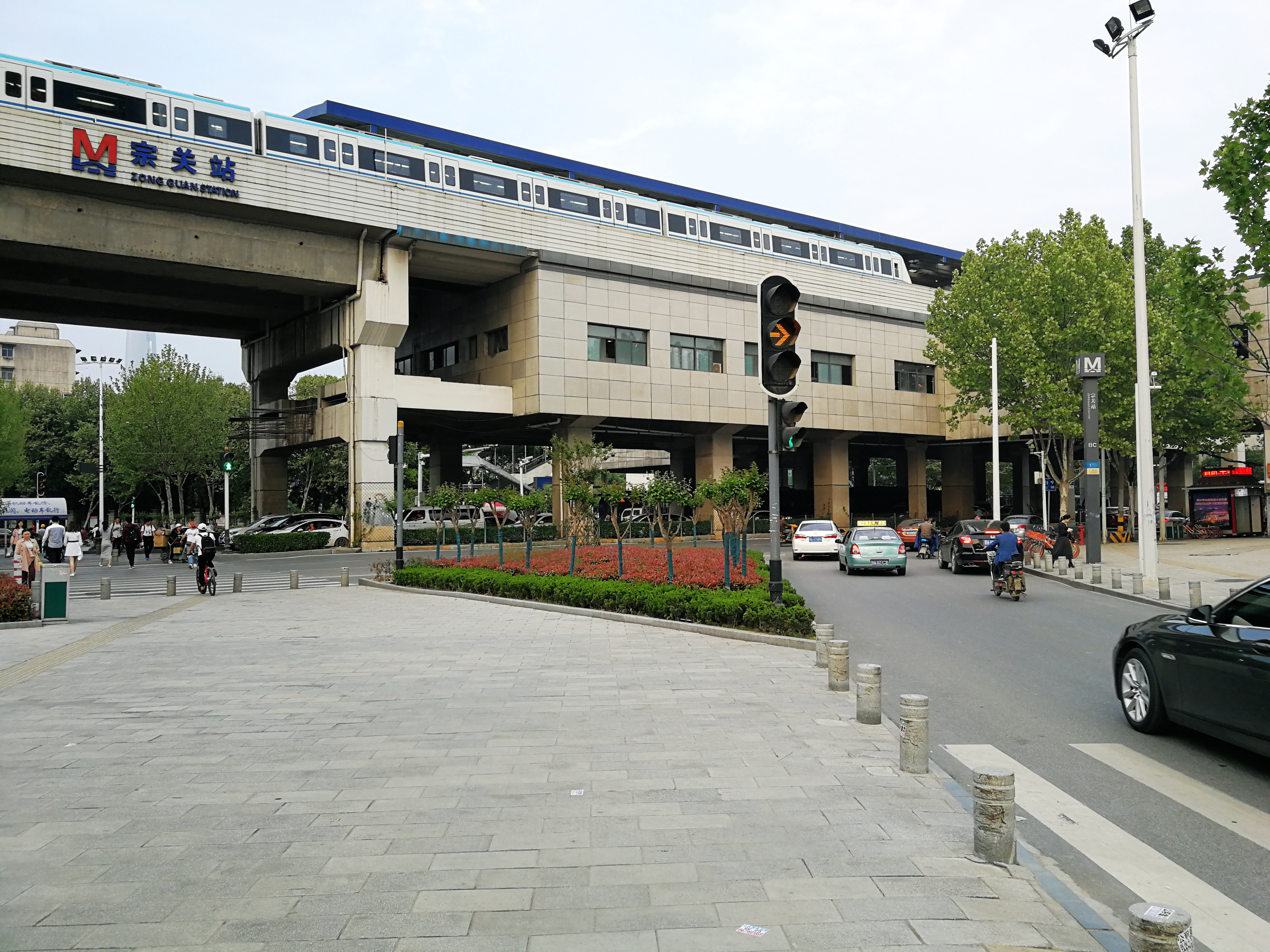

General information
- Location: Qiaokou District, Wuhan, Hubei; China
- Coordinates: 30°34′59″N 114°13′16″E
- Operated by: Wuhan Metro Co., Ltd
- Lines: Line 1; Line 3
- Platforms: 4 (2 island platforms)

Construction
- Structure type: Elevated and underground

History
- Opened: July 28, 2004; 21 years ago (Line 1); December 28, 2015; 10 years ago (Line 3)

Services
Preceding station	Wuhan Metro	Following station
Hanxi 1st Road towards Jinghe	Line 1	Taipingyang towards Hankou North
Shuangdun towards Hongtu Boulevard	Line 3	Wangjiawan towards Zhuanyang Boulevard
Location

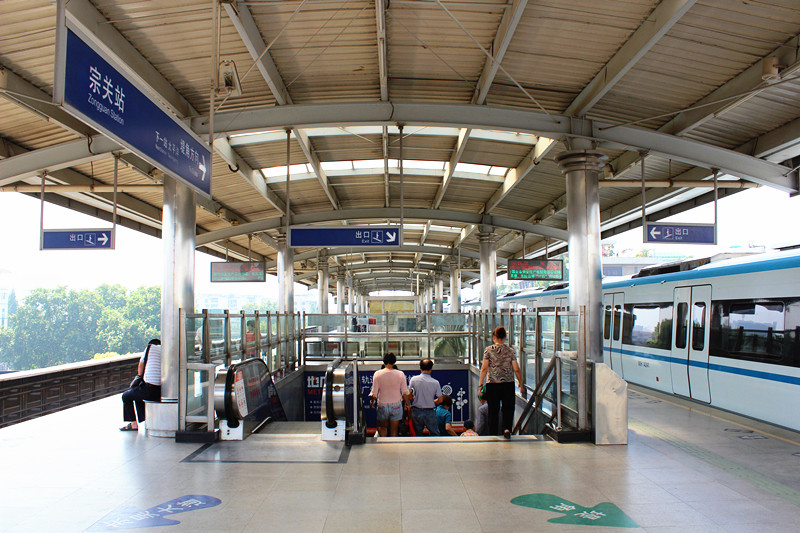
Line 1 platform (2013)

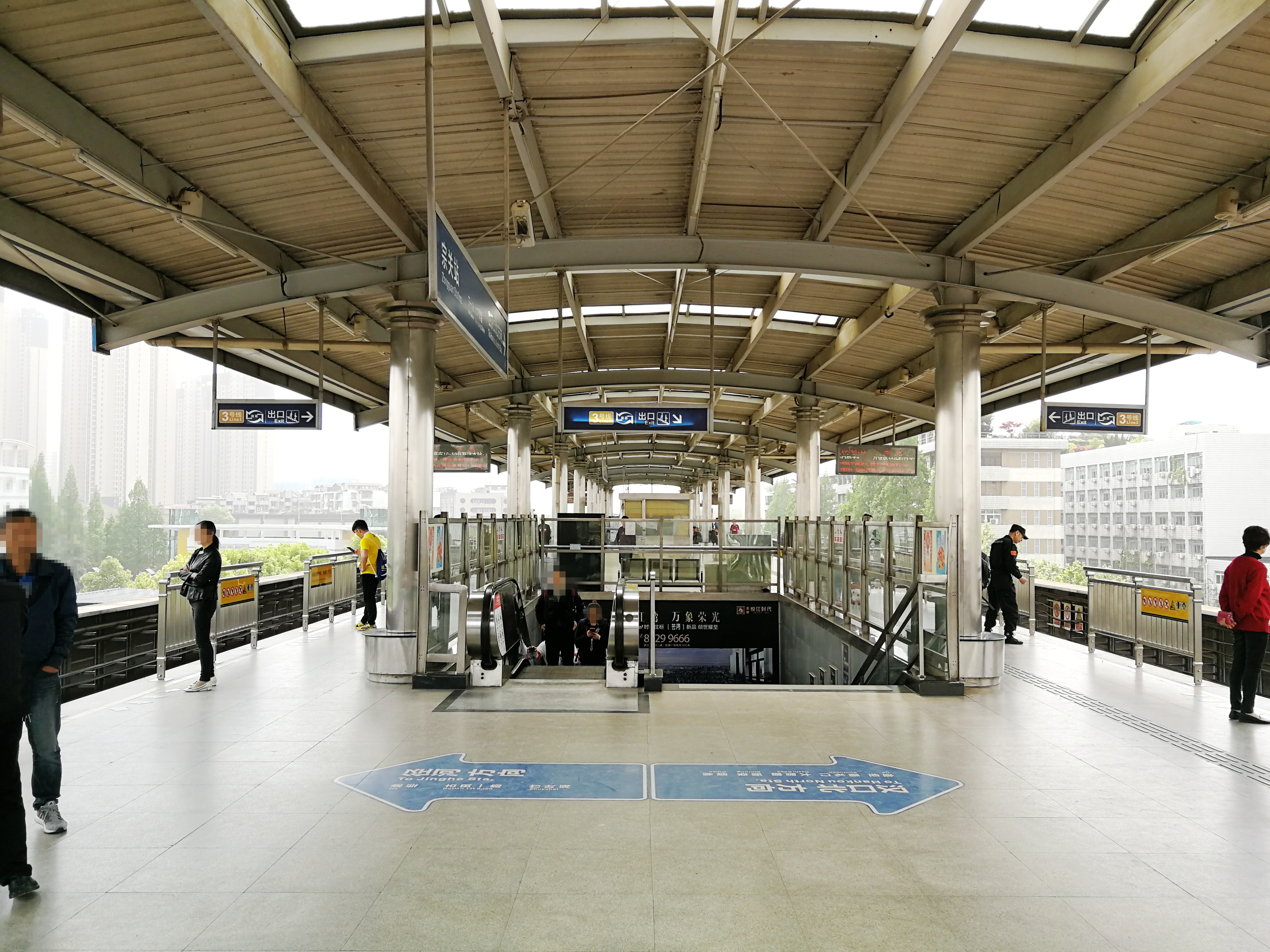
Line 1 platform (2018)

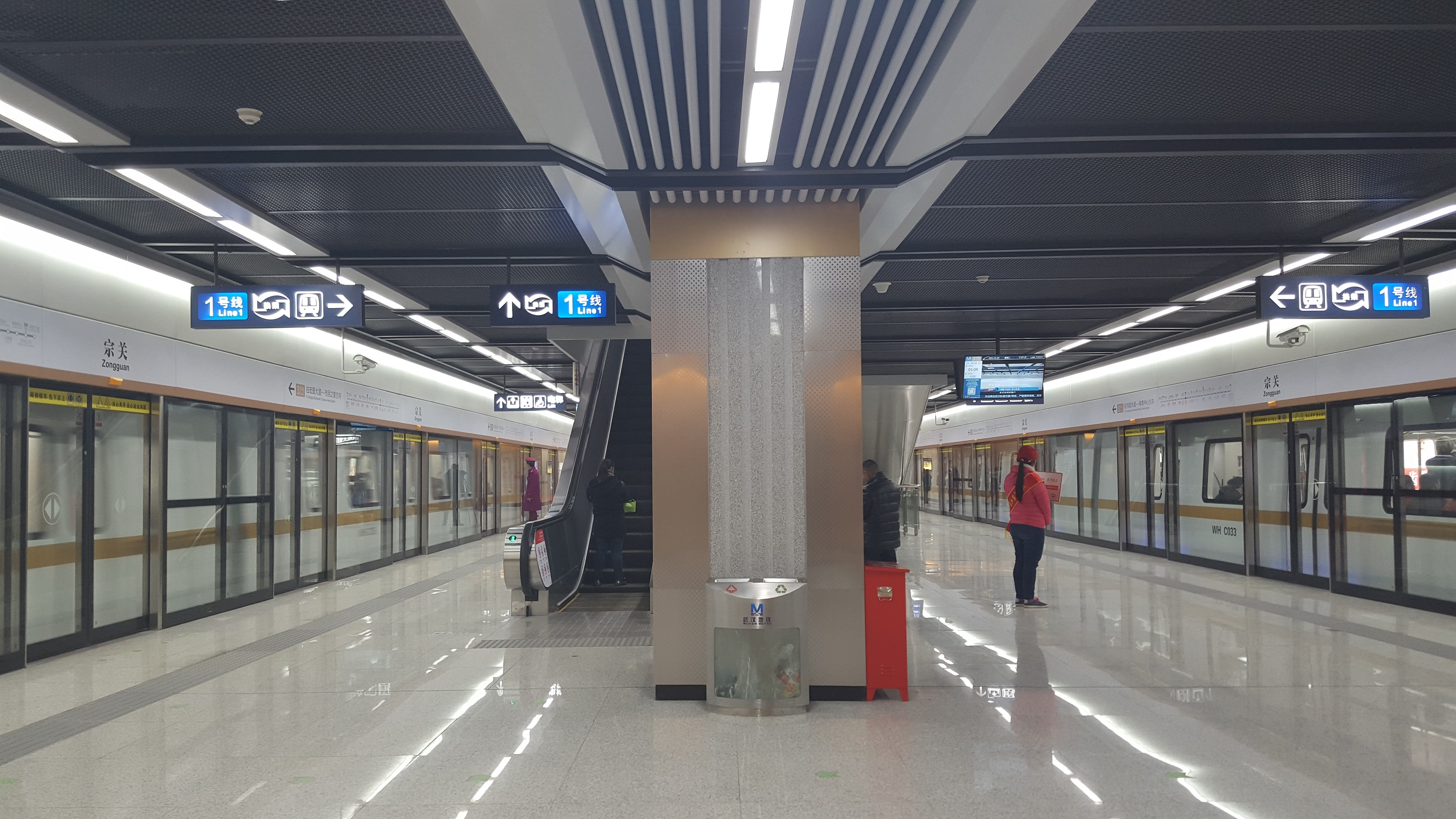
Line 3 platform

Zongguan station (Chinese: 宗关站) is a station of Line 1 and Line 3 of Wuhan Metro. It entered revenue service with the completion of Line 1, Phase 1 on July 28, 2004. It is located in Qiaokou District. The station has an island platform and a single-track crossover on the west end of the station. The station served as the terminus of Line 1 from 2004 to 2010. The Line 3 station opened on December 28, 2015.

== Station layout ==
3F	Westbound	← Line 1 towards Jinghe (Hanxi 1st Road)
3F	Island platform, doors open on the left
3F	Eastbound	Line 1 towards Hankou North (Taipingyang) →
2F	Concourse	Faregates, station agent
G	Entrances and exits	Exits A-E
B1	Concourse	Faregates, station agent
B2		Transfer passage
B3	Northbound	← Line 3 towards Hongtu Boulevard (Shuangdun)
B3	Island platform, doors open on the left
B3	Southbound	Line 3 towards Zhuanyang Boulevard (Wangjiawan) →

== Gallery ==
=== Line 1 ===
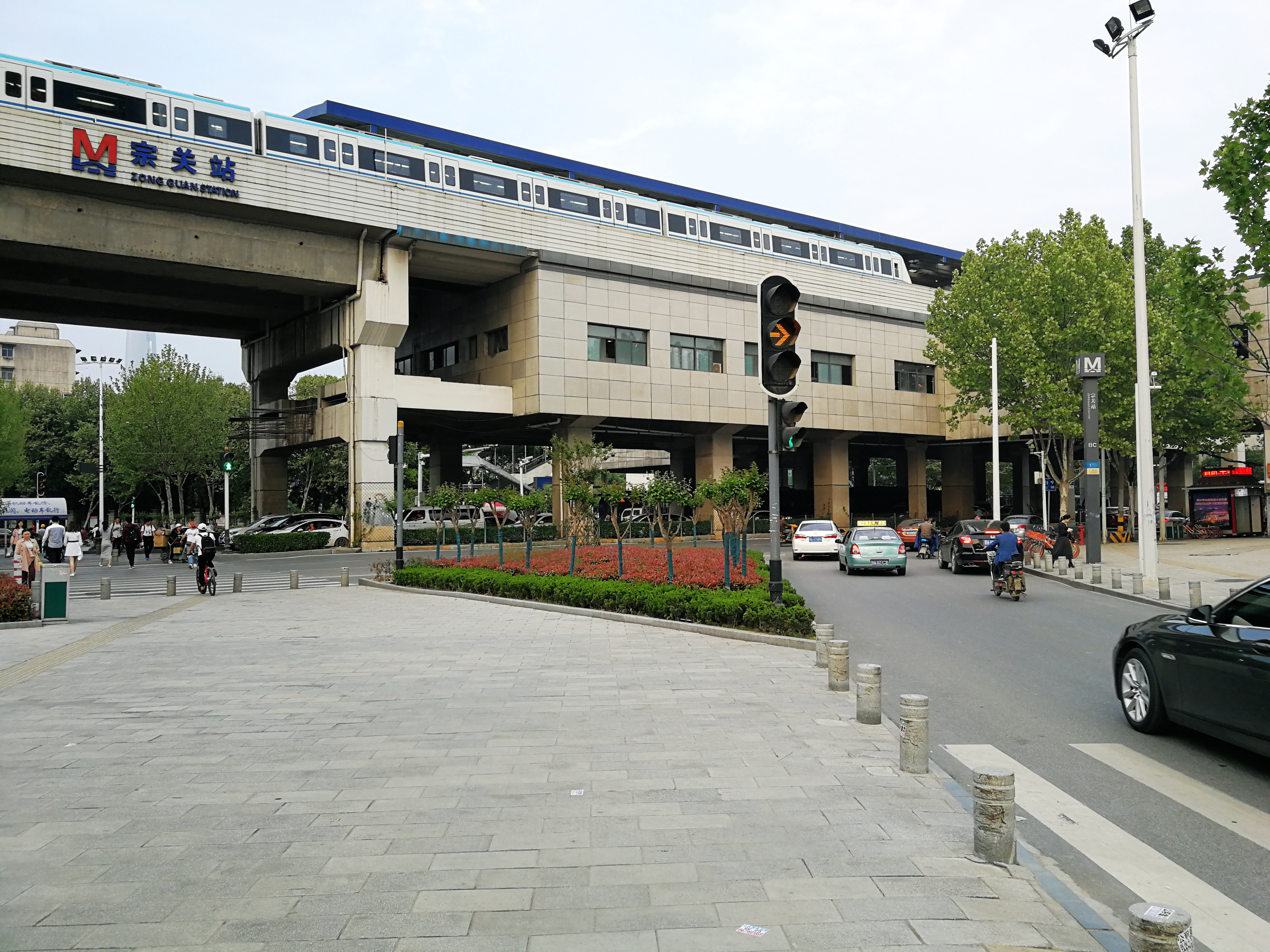
Zongguan station hall (Line 1)

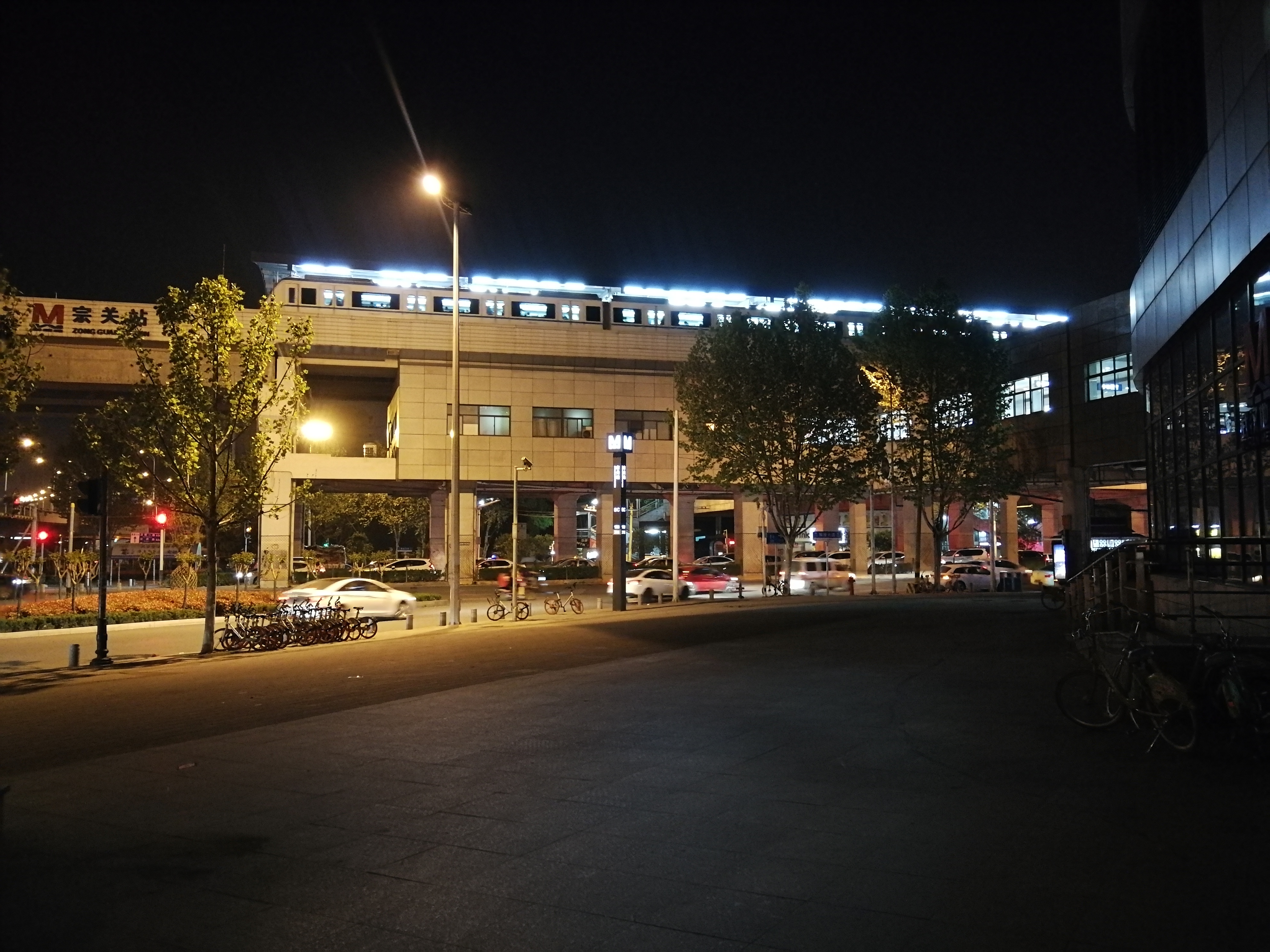
Zongguan station hall at night

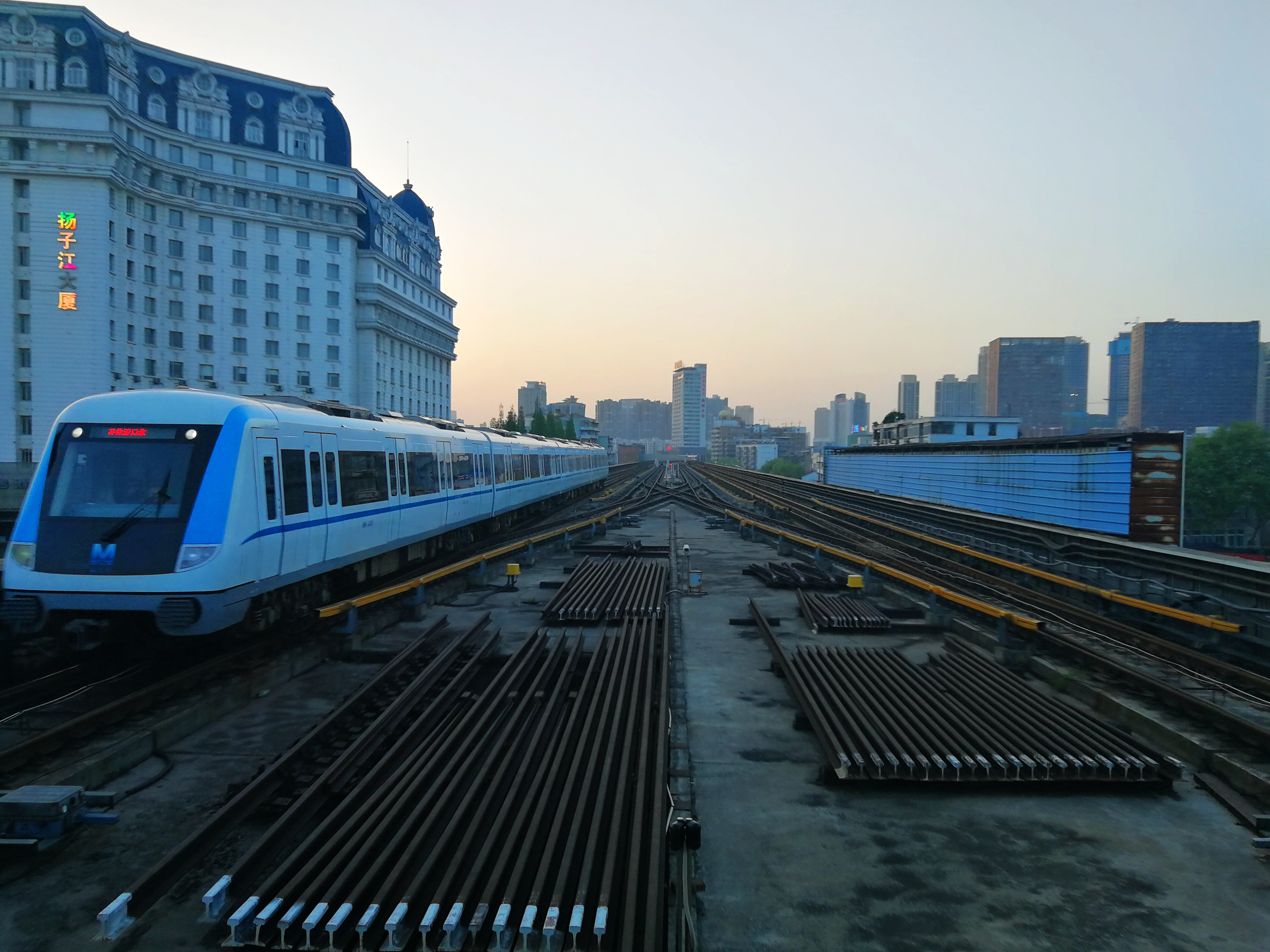
Line 1 train approaching

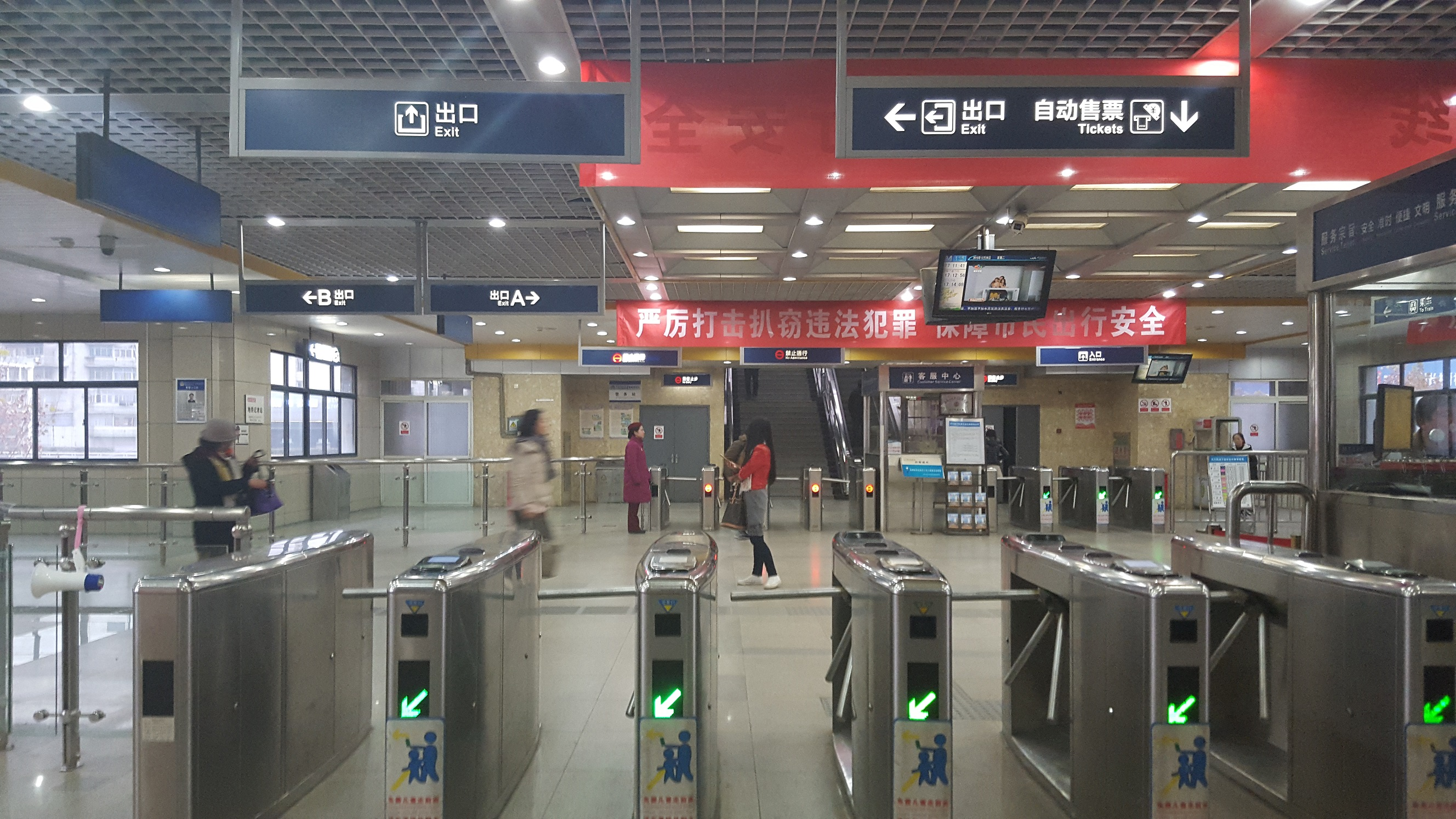
Turnstiles at the station hall (Line 1)

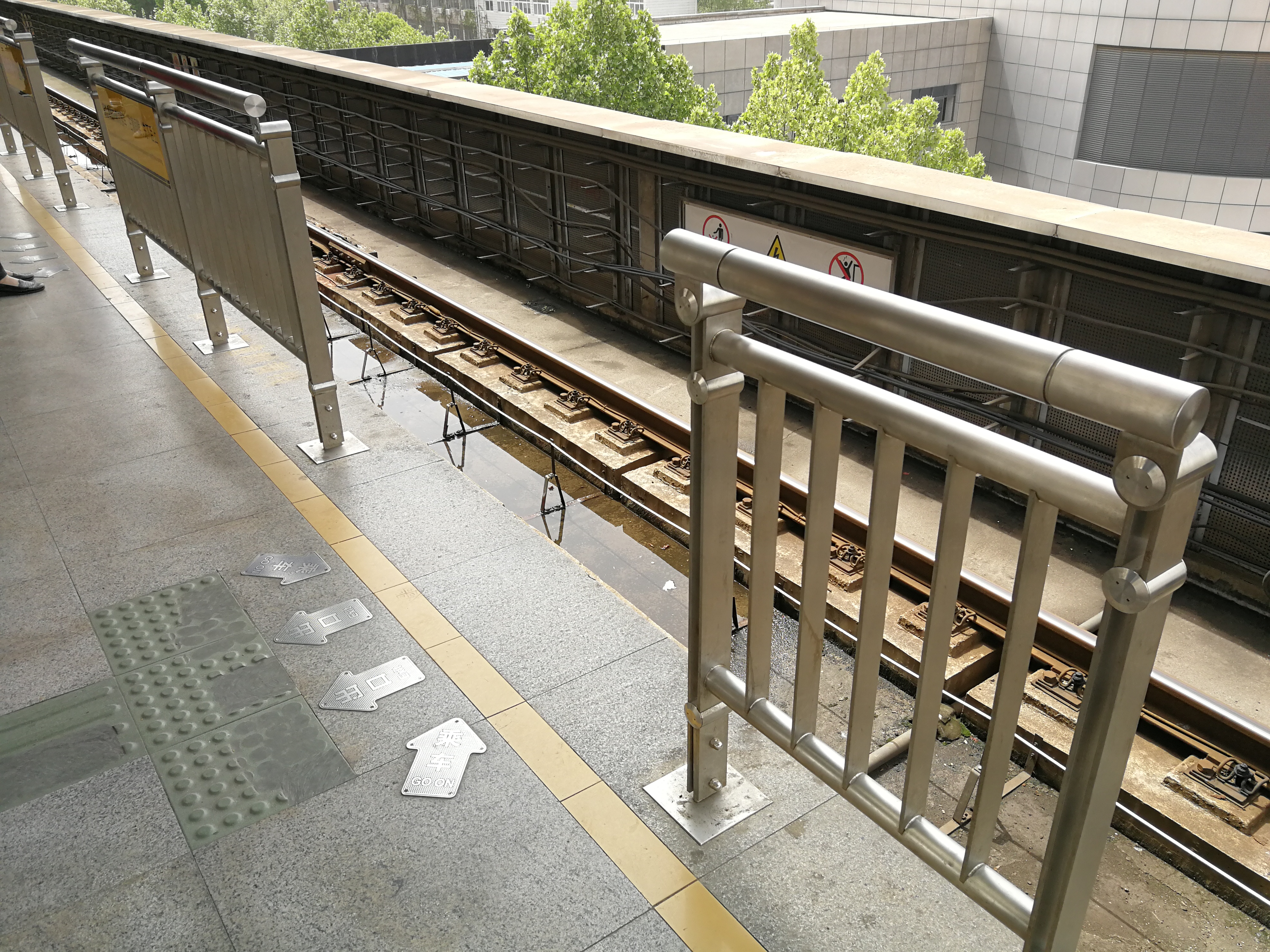
Platform barriers of Zongguan station (Line 1)

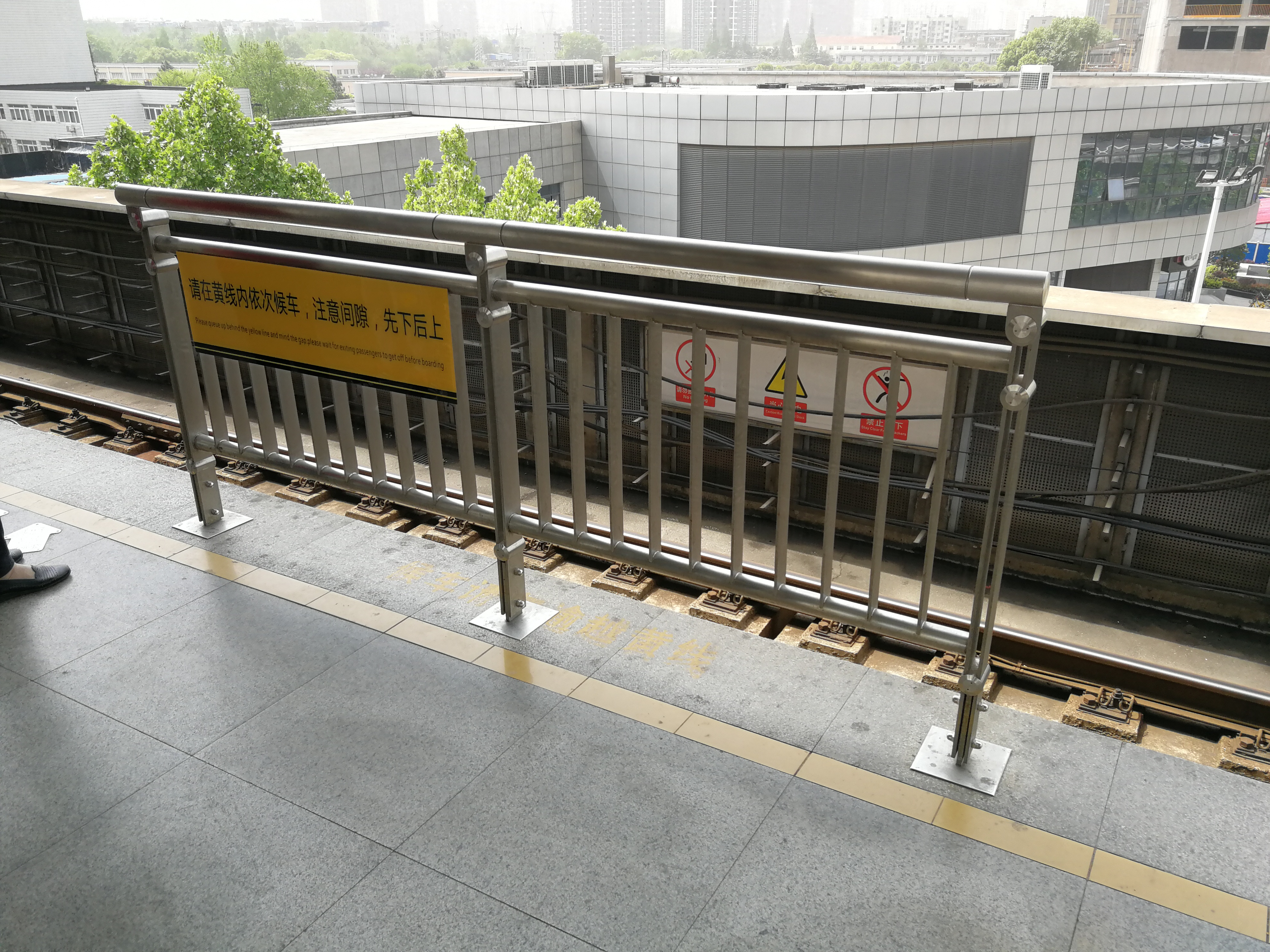
Platform barriers of Zongguan station (Line 1)

=== Interchange channel ===
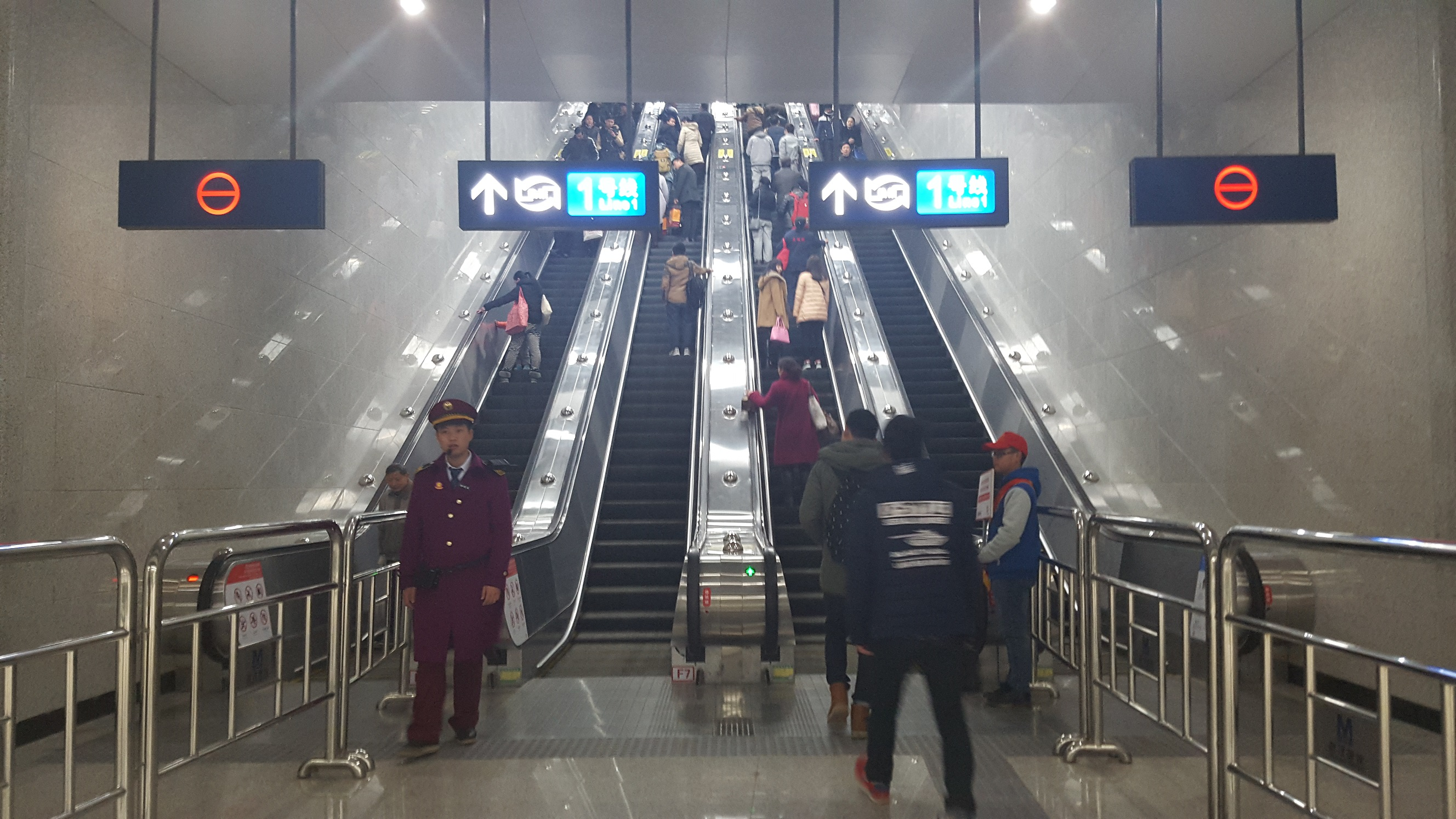
Interchange channel

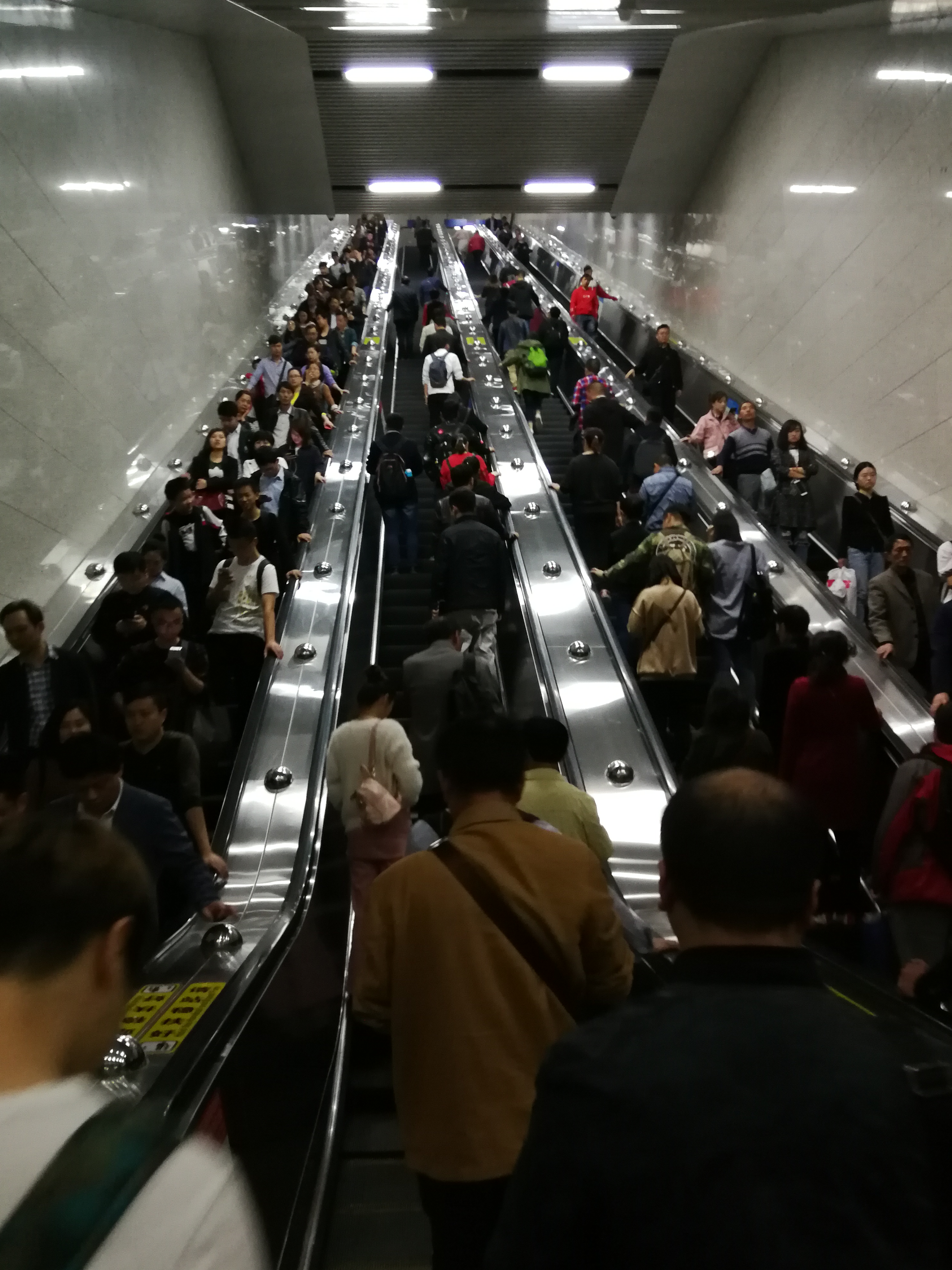
Escalator from Wuhan Metro Line 3 to Line 1

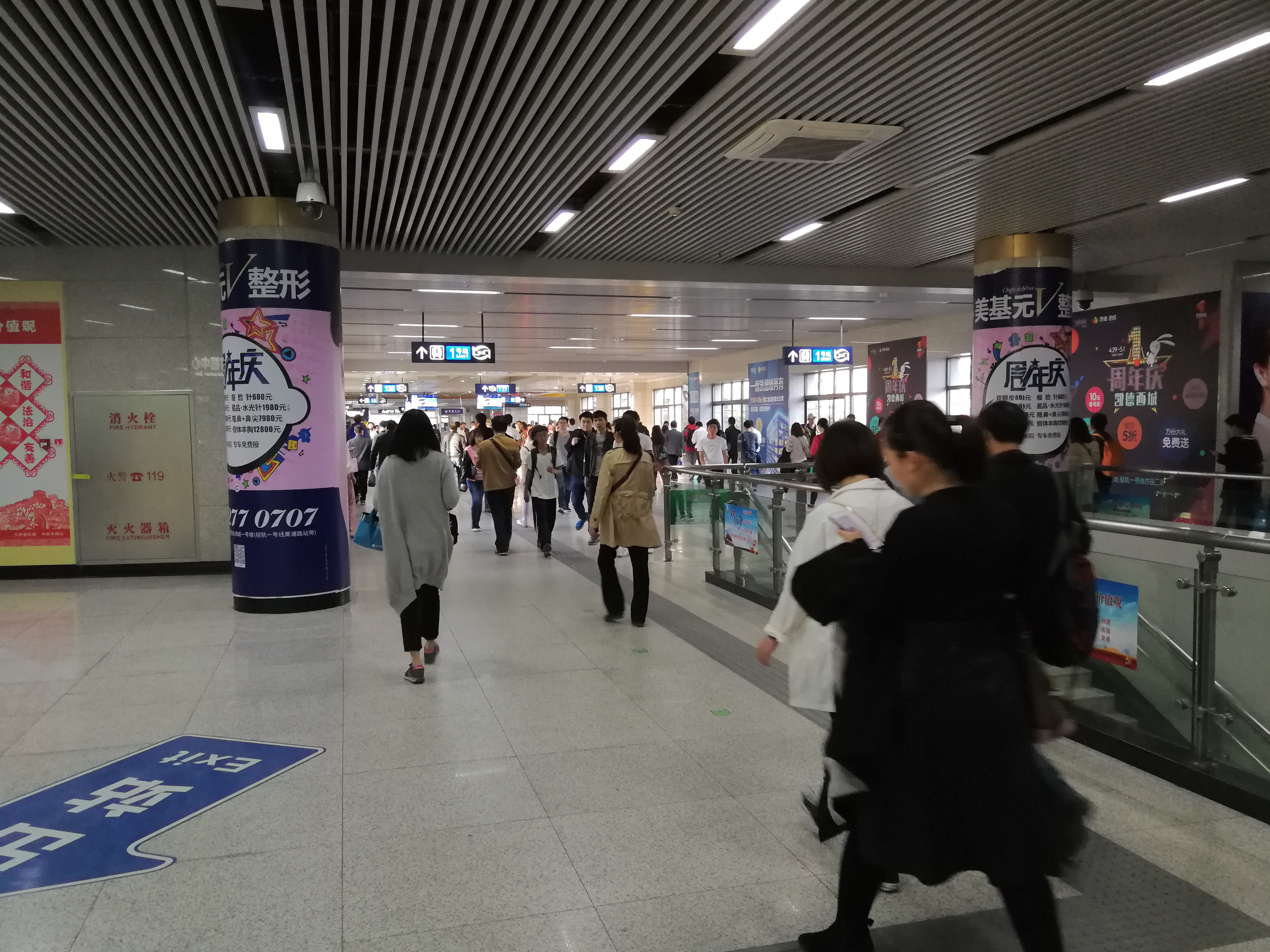
Interchange way between Line 1 and Line 3

=== Line 3 ===
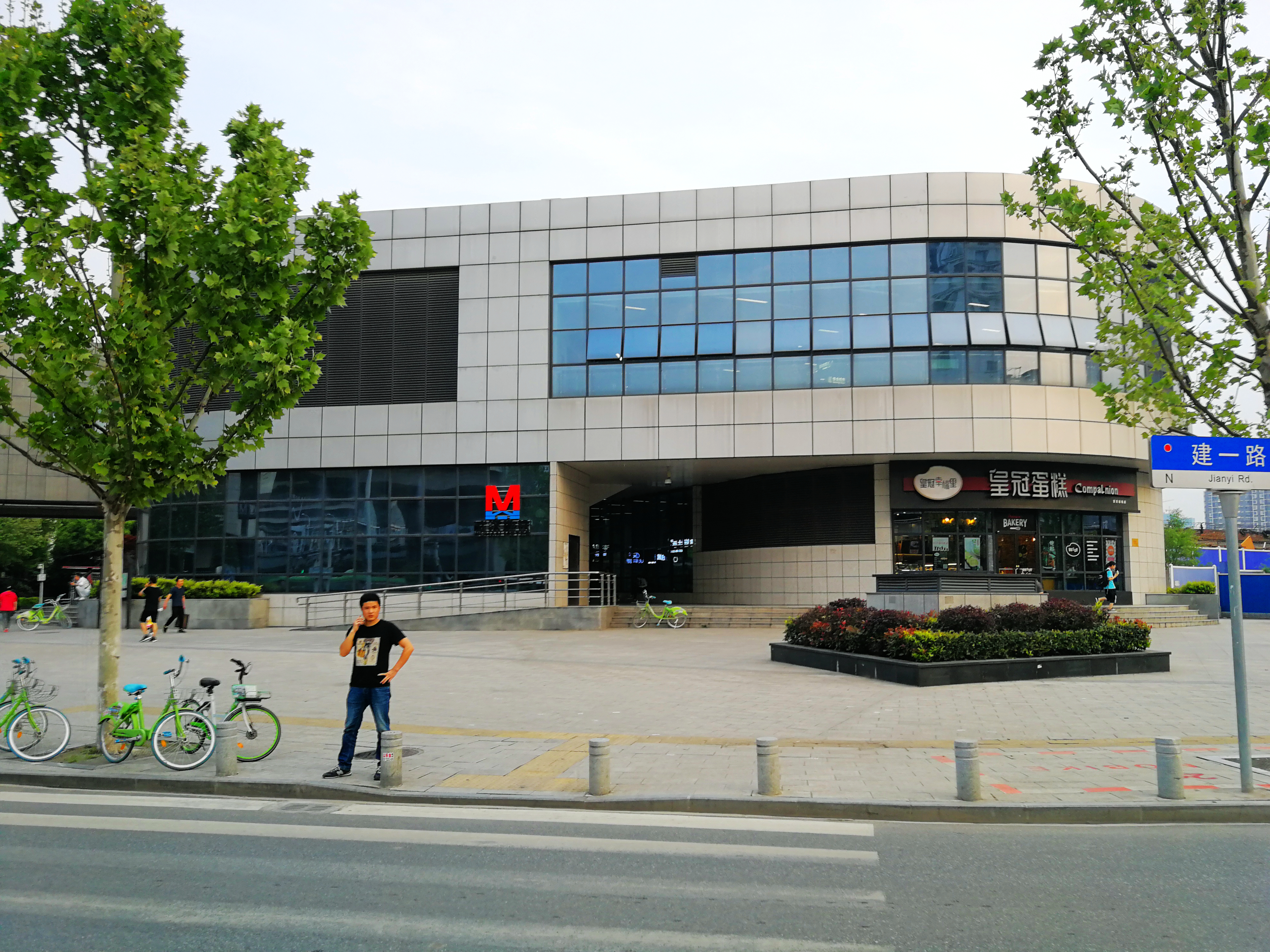
Zongguan station hall (Line 3)

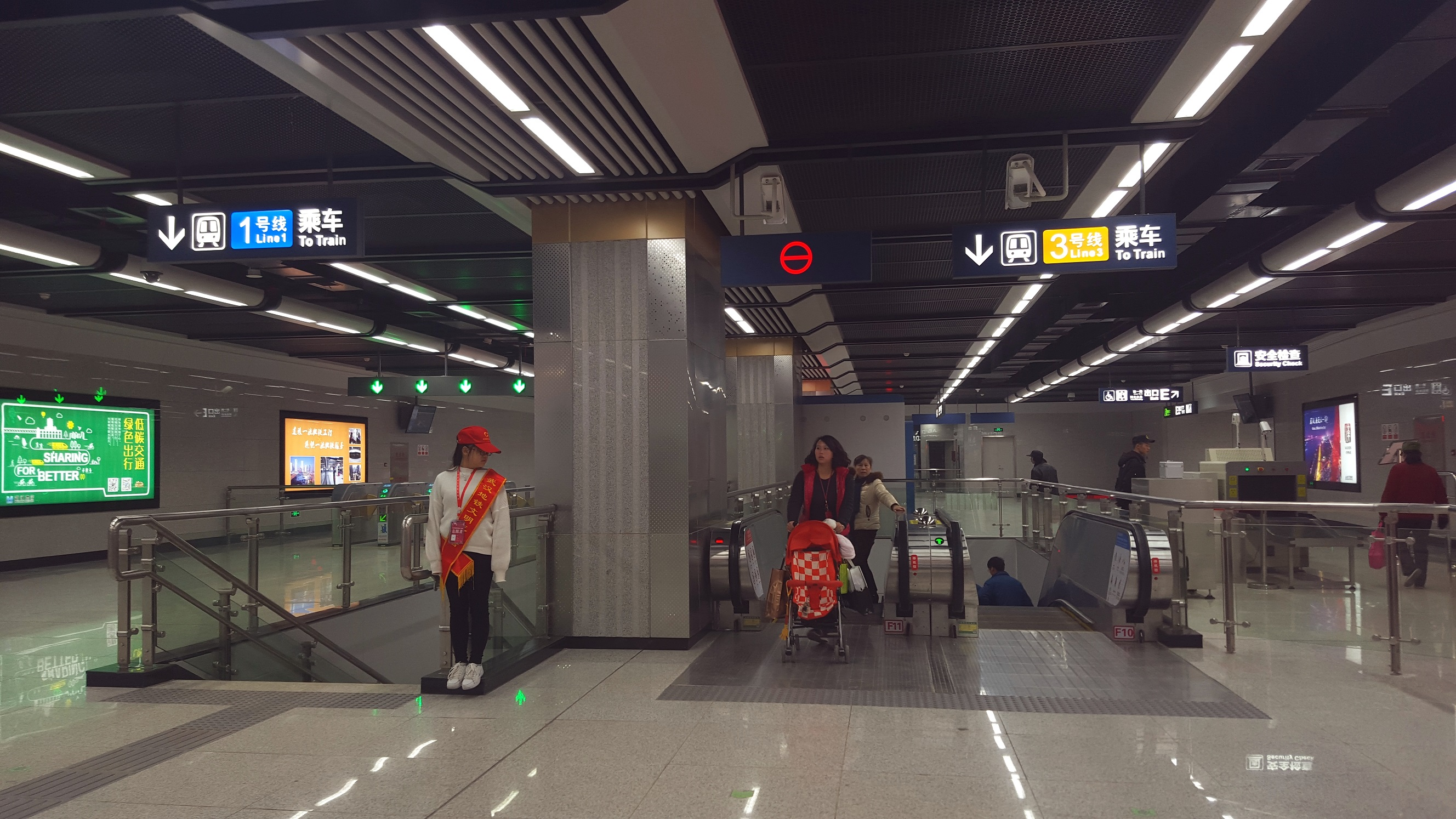
In the station hall (Line 3)

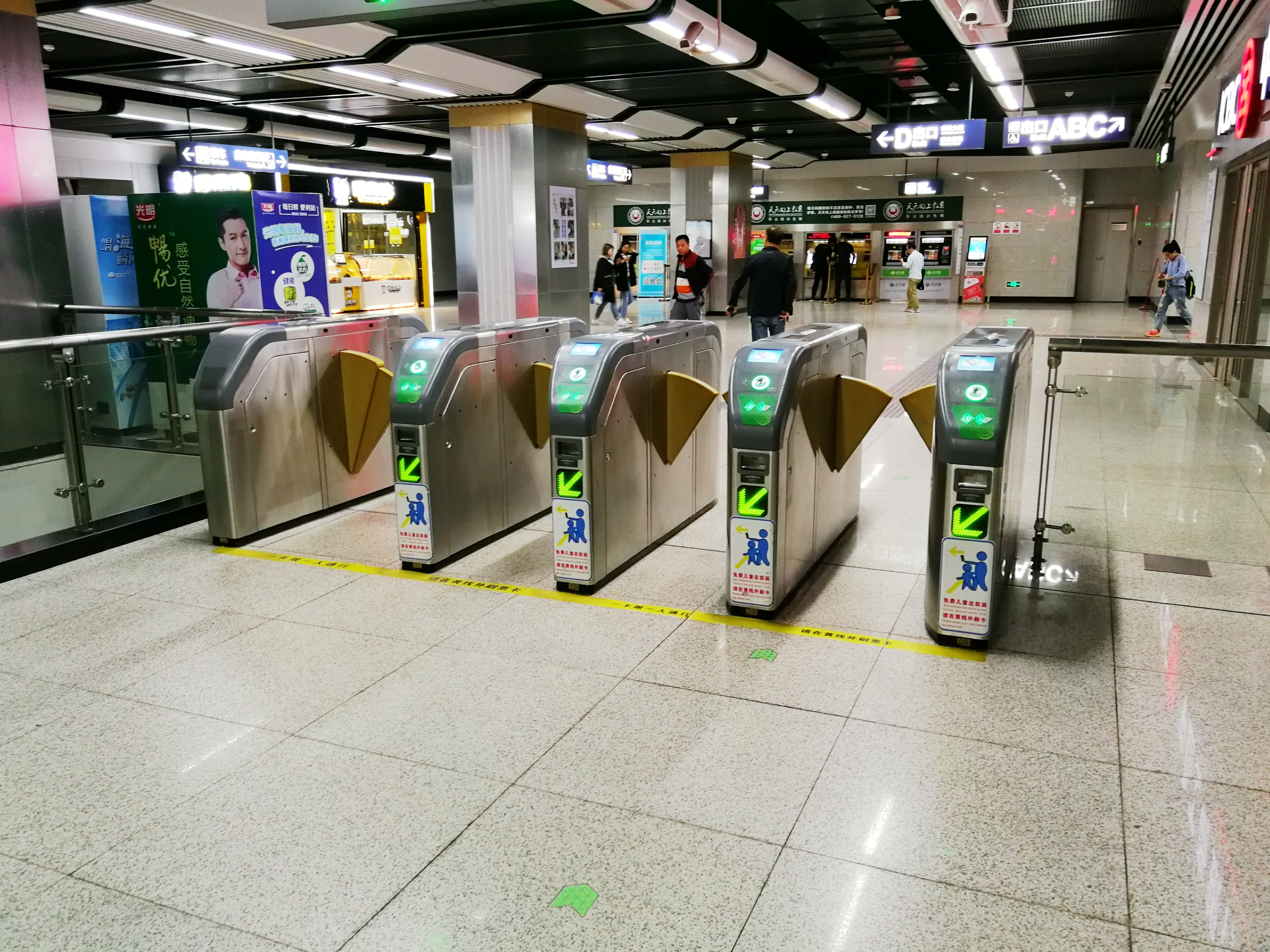
Turnstiles at the station hall of Zongguan station (Line 3)

=== Entrance ===
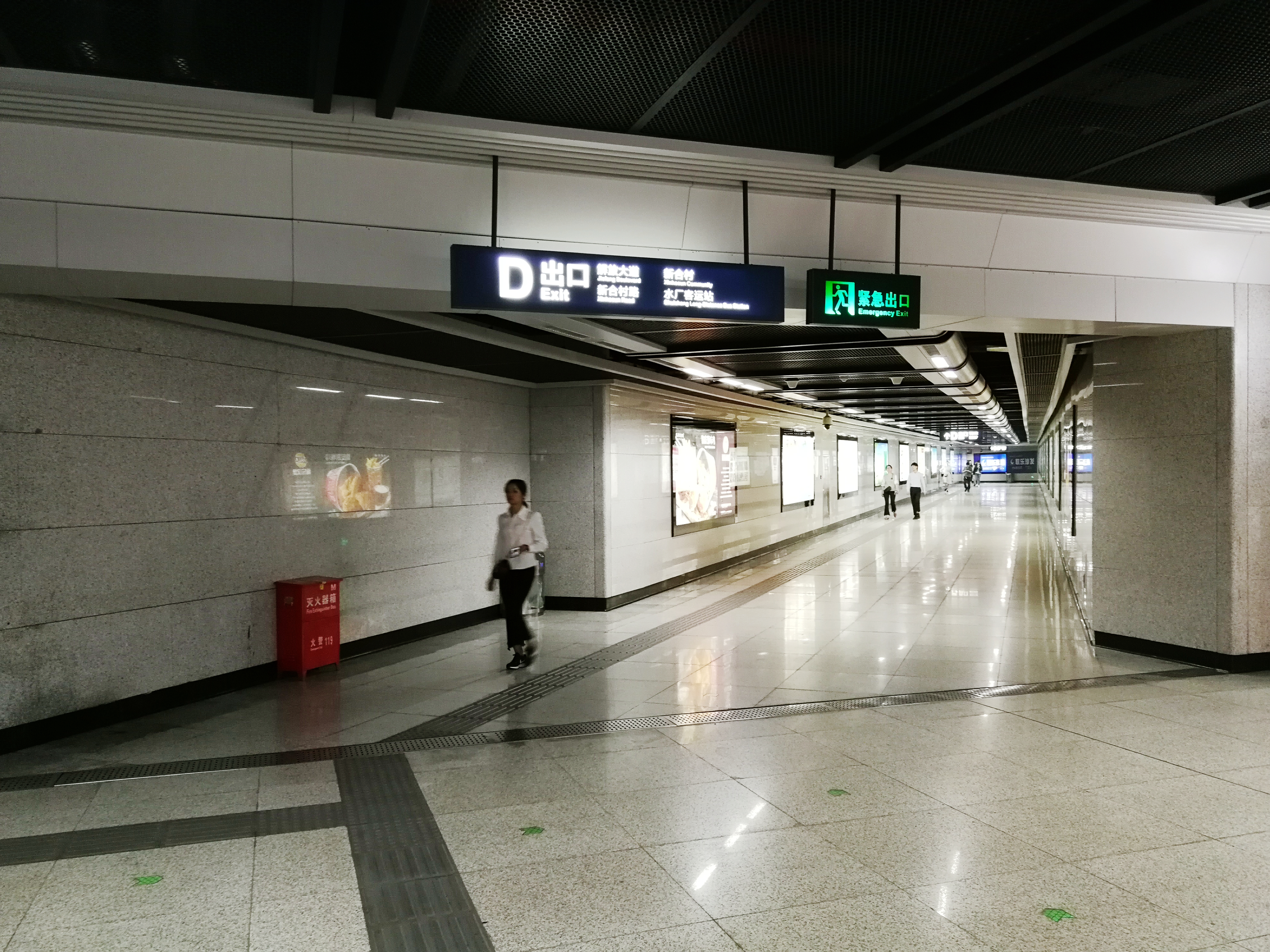
Entrance D of Zongguan station (inside)

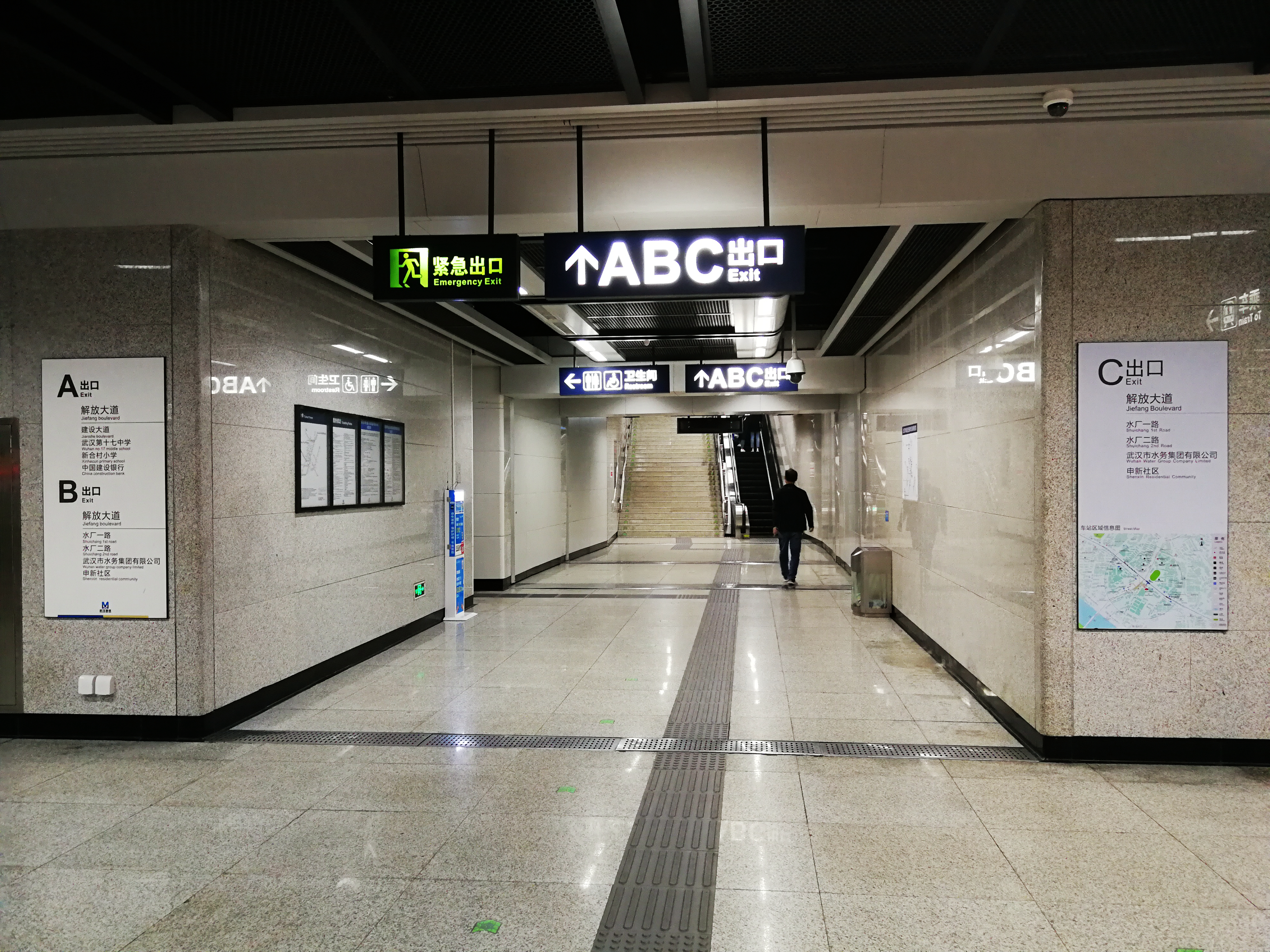
Entrance A, B, and C of Zongguan station (inside)

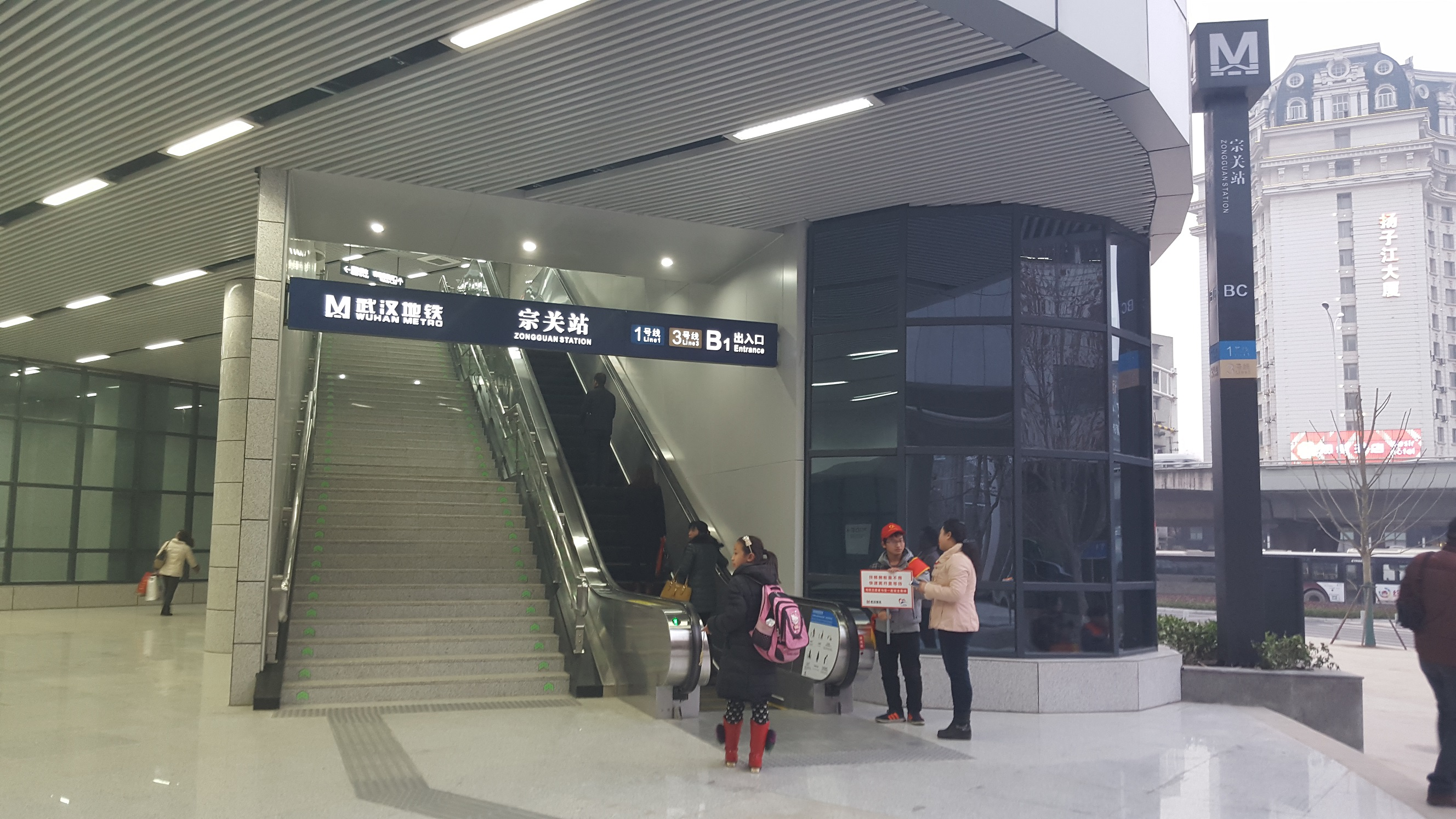
Entrance B

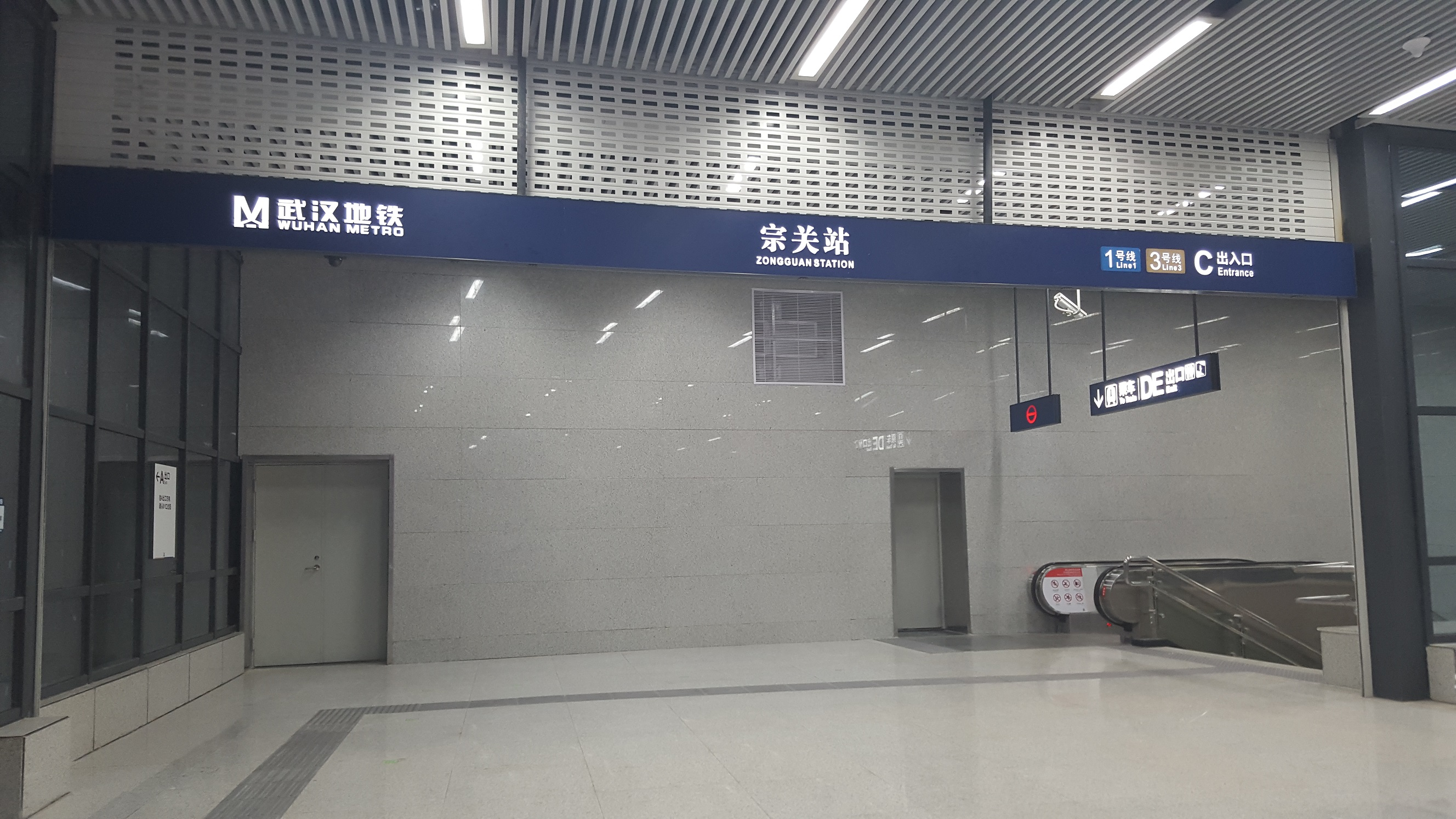
Entrance C

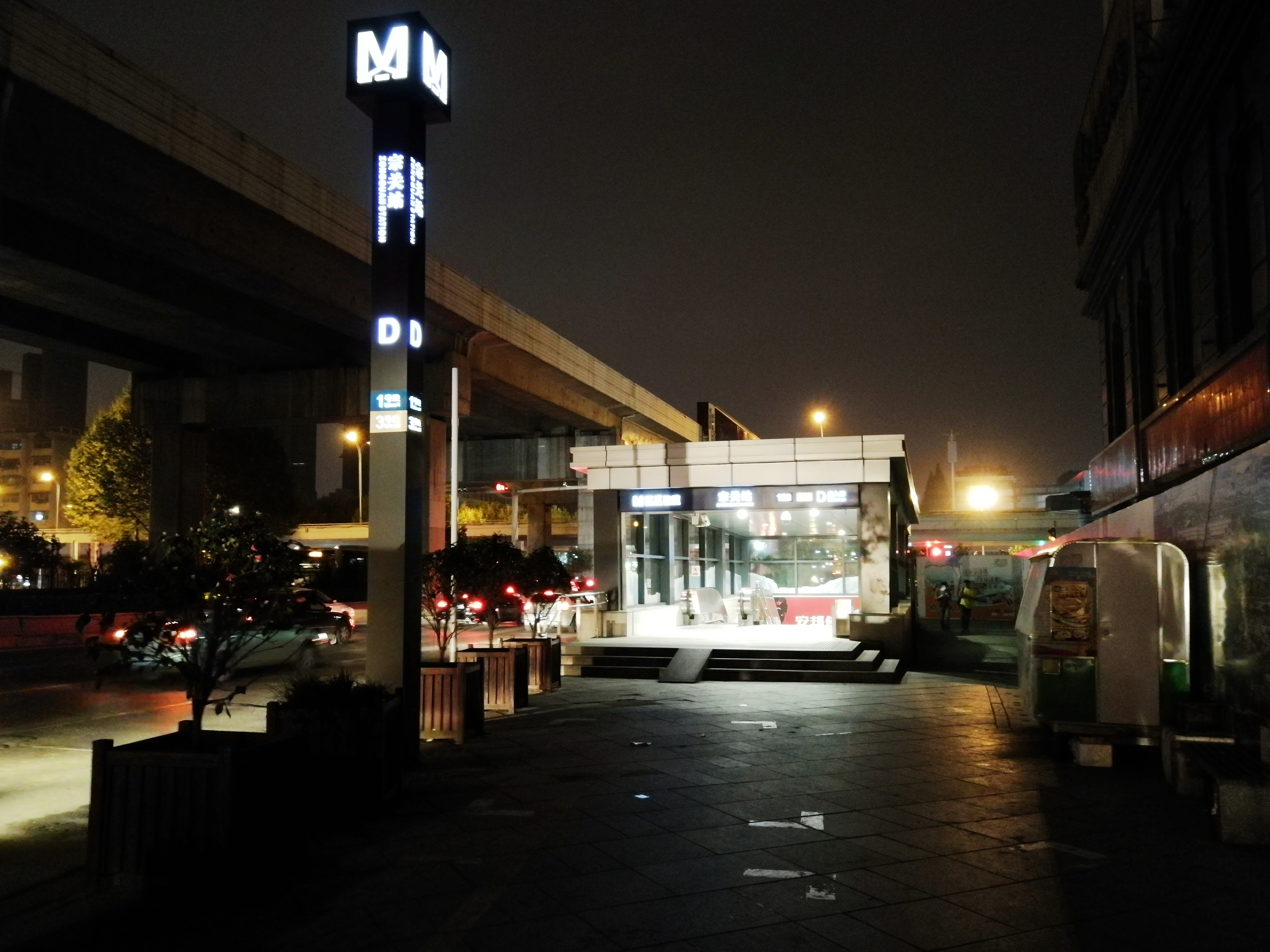
Entrance D of Zongguan station (outside, at night)

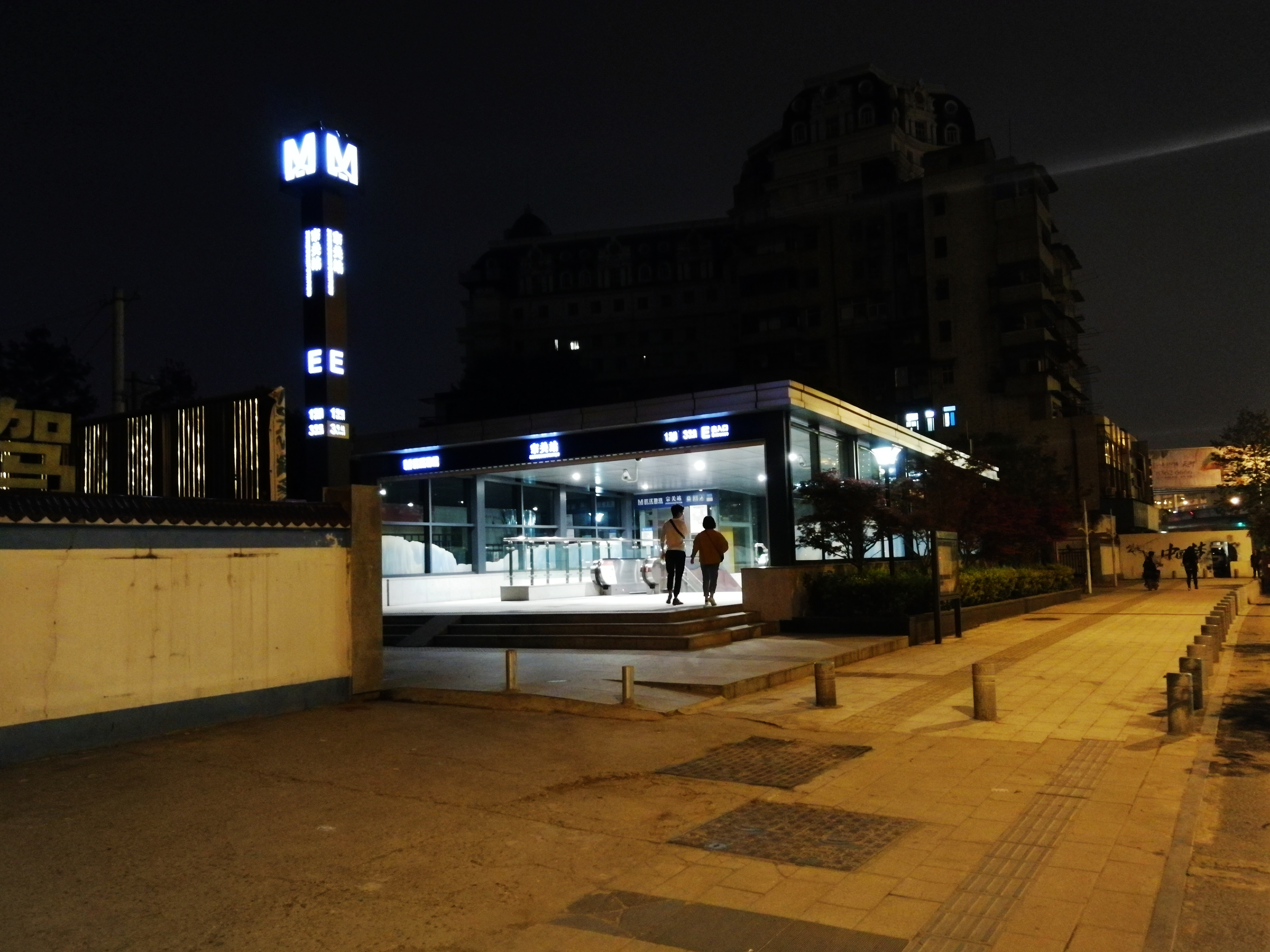
Entrance E of Zongguan station (outside, at night)

== Transfers ==
Bus transfers to routes T4, 1, 2, 208, 324, 328, 330, 505, 508, 512, 520, 523, 546, 548, 549, 558, 560, 588, 589, 597, 602, 615, 621, 646, 649, 710, 716, 720, 737, 741, 806 and 808 are available at Zongguan station.
