= Gutian 1st Road station =

Wuhan Metro station

Gutian 1st Road 古田一路 metro
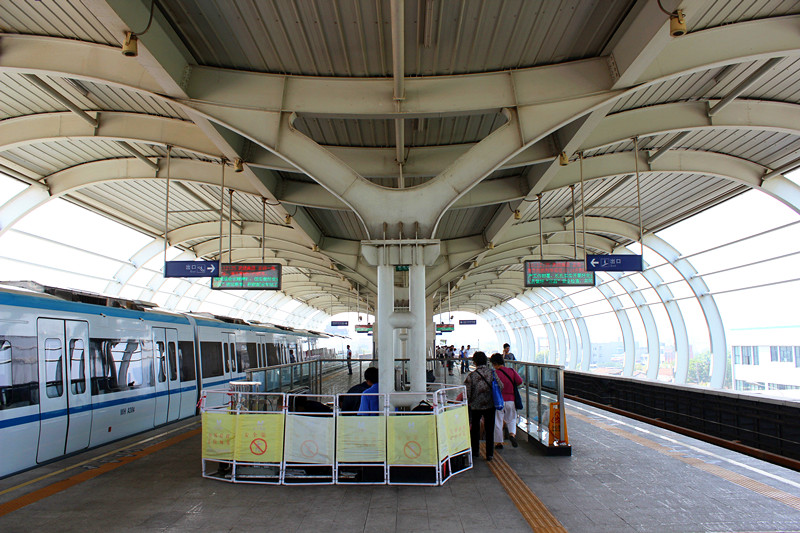

General information
- Location: Qiaokou District, Wuhan, Hubei; China
- Coordinates: 30°35′04″N 114°13′13″E
- Operated by: Wuhan Metro Co., Ltd
- Line: Line 1
- Platforms: 2 (1 island platforms)

Construction
- Structure type: Elevated

History
- Opened: July 29, 2010; 15 years ago (Line 1)

Services
Preceding station	Wuhan Metro	Following station
Duoluokou towards Jinghe	Line 1	Gutian 2nd Road towards Hankou North
Location

Gutian 1st Road station (Chinese: 古田一路站; pinyin: Gǔtián Yī Lù zhàn) is a station of Line 1 of Wuhan Metro. It entered revenue service on July 29, 2010. It is located in Qiaokou District. It is sponsored by Wulan Group.

== Station layout ==
3F	Westbound	← Line 1 towards Jinghe (Duoluokou)
3F	Island platform, doors open on the left
3F	Eastbound	Line 1 towards Hankou North (Gutian 2nd Road) →
2F	Concourse	Faregates, Station Agent
G	Entrances and Exits

== Transfers ==
Bus transfers to Route 546, 548, 741 are available at Gutian 1st Road Station.
