= Etouwan station =

Wuhan Metro station

Etouwan 额头湾
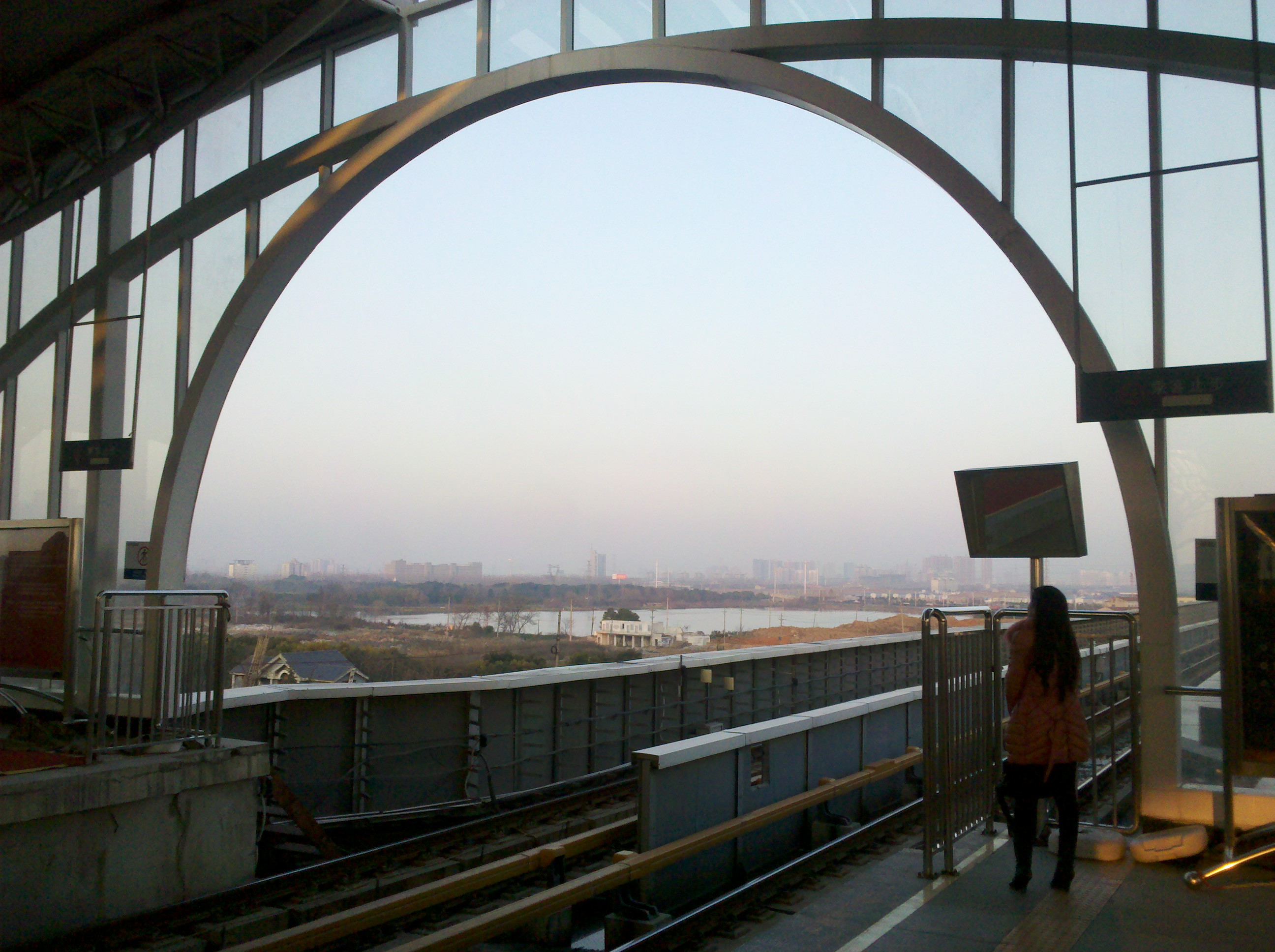
- Etouwan station in February 2013

General information
- Location: Qiaokou District, Wuhan, Hubei; China
- Coordinates: 30°37′06″N 114°09′14″E
- Operated by: Wuhan Metro Co., Ltd
- Line: Line 1
- Platforms: 2 (2 side platforms)

Construction
- Structure type: Elevated

History
- Opened: July 29, 2010; 15 years ago (Line 1)

Services
Preceding station	Wuhan Metro	Following station
Wuhuan Avenue towards Jinghe	Line 1	Zhuyehai towards Hankou North
Location

Etouwan Station (Chinese: 额头湾站) is a station of Line 1 of Wuhan Metro. It entered revenue service on July 29, 2010. It is located in Qiaokou District.

== Station layout ==
3F	Side platform, doors open on the right
3F	Westbound	← Line 1 towards Jinghe (Wuhuan Avenue)
3F	Eastbound	Line 1 towards Hankou North (Zhuyehai) →
3F	Side platform, doors open on the right
2F	Concourse	Faregates, Station Agent
G	Entrances and Exits

== Transfers ==
Bus transfers to Route 218, 222, 505, 546, 560, 621, 736, 737, 741 are available at Etouwan Station.
