= Wuhuan Boulevard station =

Wuhan Metro station

Wuhuan Boulevard 五环大道 metro
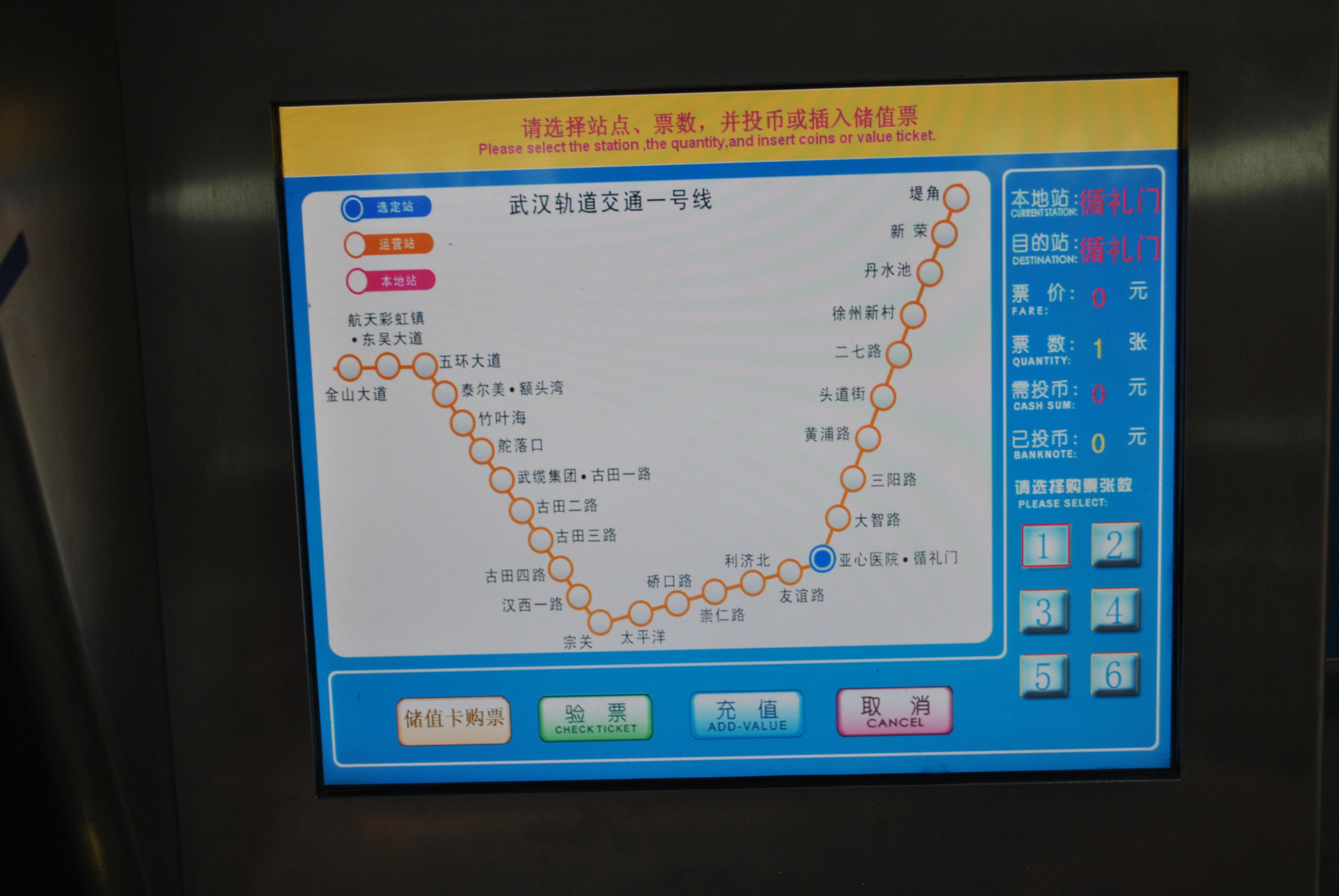

General information
- Location: Dongxihu District, Wuhan, Hubei; China
- Coordinates: 30°35′04″N 114°13′13″E
- Operated by: Wuhan Metro Co., Ltd
- Line: Line 1
- Platforms: 2 (2 side platforms)

Construction
- Structure type: Elevated

History
- Opened: July 29, 2010; 15 years ago (Line 1)

Services
Preceding station	Wuhan Metro	Following station
Dongwu Boulevard towards Jinghe	Line 1	Etouwan towards Hankou North
Location

Wuhuan Boulevard Station (Chinese: 五环大道站) is a station of Line 1 of Wuhan Metro. It entered revenue service on July 29, 2010. It is located in Dongxihu District.

== Station layout ==
3F	Side platform, doors open on the right
3F	Westbound	← Line 1 towards Jinghe (Dongwu Boulevard)
3F	Eastbound	Line 1 towards Hankou North (Etouwan) →
3F	Side platform, doors open on the right
2F	Concourse	Faregates, Station Agent
G	Entrances and Exits

== Transfers ==
Bus transfers to Route 218, 222, 560, 736, 528, H83 inner line and HM2 are available at Wuhuan Avenue Station.
