= Sandian station =

Wuhan Metro station

Sandian 三店 metro
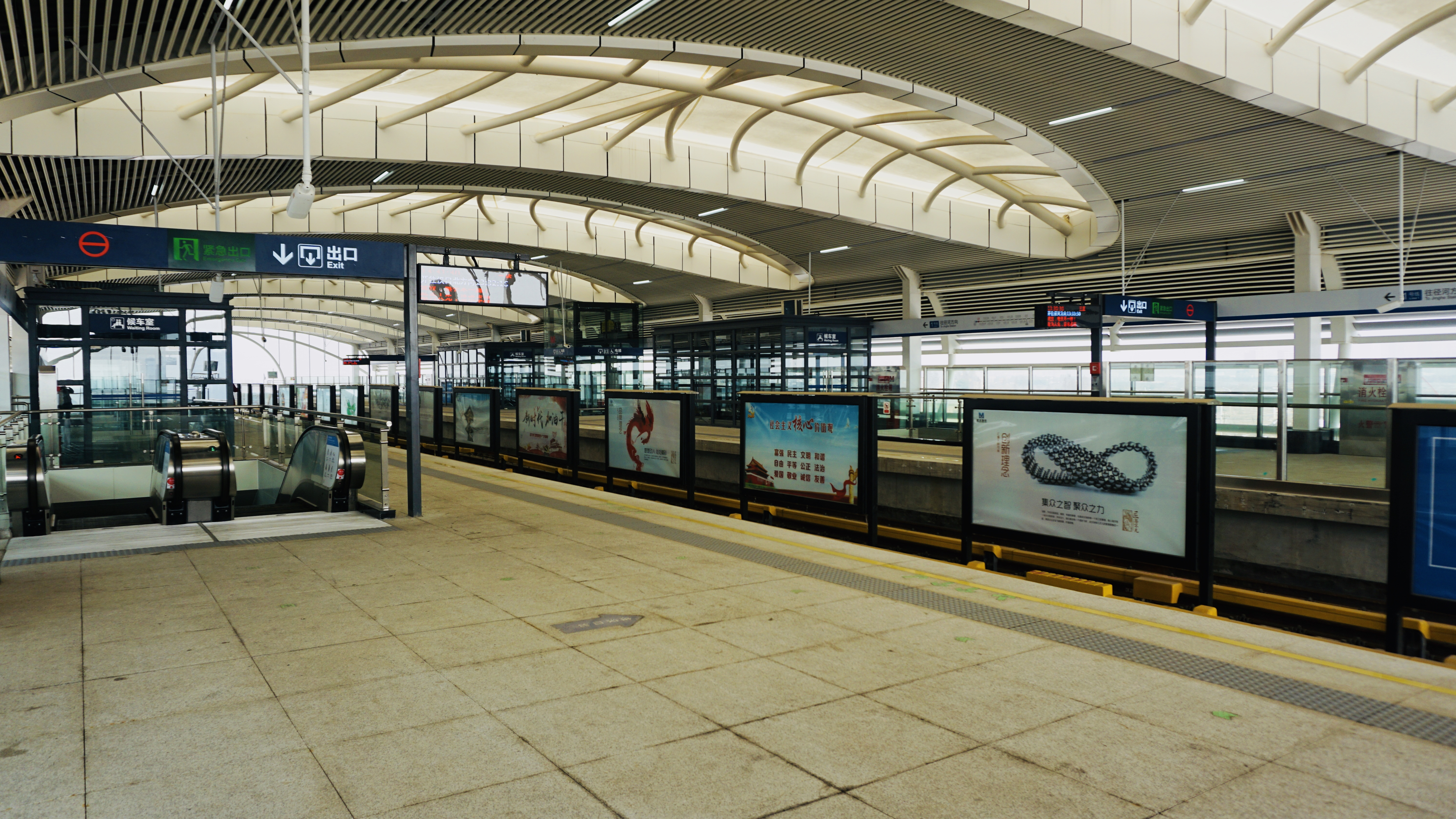

General information
- Location: Dongxihu District, Wuhan, Hubei; China
- Coordinates: 30.6515°N 114.1152°E
- Operated by: Wuhan Metro Co., Ltd
- Line: Line 1
- Platforms: 2 (2 side platforms)

Construction
- Structure type: Elevated

History
- Opened: December 26, 2017; 8 years ago (Line 1)

Services
Preceding station	Wuhan Metro	Following station
Jinghe Terminus	Line 1	Matoutan Park towards Hankou North
Location

Sandian Station (Chinese: 三店站) is a station on Line 1 of the Wuhan Metro. It entered revenue service on December 26, 2017. It is located in Dongxihu District.

== Station layout ==
3F	Side platform, doors open on the right
3F	Westbound	← Line 1 towards Jinghe (Terminus)
3F	Eastbound	Line 1 towards Hankou North (Matoutan Park) →
3F	Side platform, doors open on the right
2F	Concourse	Faregates, Station Agent
G	Entrances and Exits
