= Line 1 (Wuhan Metro) =

Line of Wuhan Metro

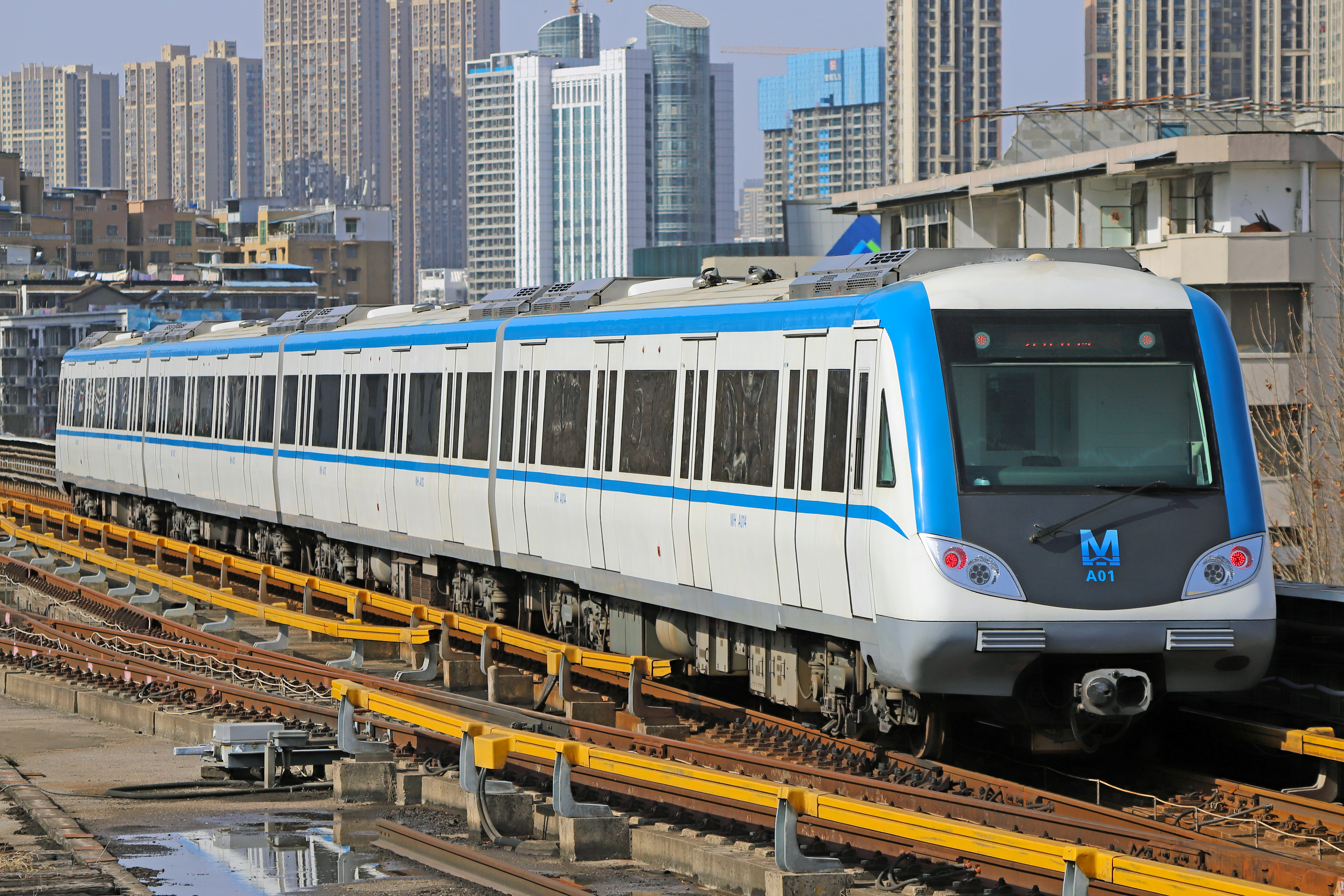

Overview
- Status: Operational
- Owner: Wuhan
- Locale: Wuhan, China
- Termini: Hankou North; Jinghe
- Stations: 32

Service
- Type: Rapid transit
- System: Wuhan Metro
- Services: 1
- Operator: Wuhan Metro Group Co., Ltd.
- Rolling stock: CRRC Changchun Railway Vehicles Chinese Type B CRRC Zhuzhou Locomotive Chinese Type B
- Daily ridership: 404,100 (Nov. 2018 daily average)

History
- Opened: 28 July 2004; 22 years ago

Technical
- Line length: 38 km (23.61 mi)
- Num of tracks: 2
- Character: Elevated
- Track gauge: 1,435 mm (4 ft 8 1/2 in)
- Electrification: Third rail 750 V DC
Route map

Line 1 of the Wuhan Metro (Chinese: 武汉轨道交通一号线) is an elevated metro line in the city of Wuhan, Hubei. It is the longest continuous metro viaduct in the world. Line 1 opened on 28 July 2004, making Wuhan the fifth city in mainland China to have a metro system after Beijing, Tianjin, Shanghai and Guangzhou. This is the first Metro line in China incorrectly referred to as a light rail (轻轨; qīngguǐ) line in Chinese terminology because it is elevated. (Note: Wuhan, along with other three Chinese cities, has been the first batch to be approved to build so-called "light rail" system in China since 2000, see 2000年，国家批准长春、大连、武汉和重庆4个城市为首批轻轨建设示范城市. Archived from the original on 2014-01-08.. However, Changchun built a true light-rail system, Dalian built a metro-style commuter rail system (and is referred to as 快轨; kuàiguǐ, not "轻轨 qīngguǐ"), and Chongqing opted for a monorail system, whereas Wuhan was the only one to build an elevated metro system. See "Urbanrail—Wuhan" Archived 2010-04-09 at the Wayback Machine and affiliated Wikipedia pages. See also a comment from He Jibin, an Urban Planning official from Wuhan Municipality: "Do not assume only underground lines are metro, Line 1 is also a type of metro..." (“不要认为地下的才是地铁，1号线也是地铁的一种方式……”何继斌开门见山地纠正概念，他是武汉市国土规划局交通市政处处长……) Li Fei (李斐) (March 2012). 那些年，我们一起追的地铁. 大武汉. 148: 33. Archived from the original on 2012-10-14.) Originally a branch line was planned to cross the Yangtze to Wuchang District via the Second Wuhan Yangtze River Bridge. The Second Wuhan River Bridge even had a provision in the central median where Line 1 trains would run in anticipation for the branch line when it opened in 1995. However, by 2003 the reservation was removed to allow for more traffic lanes when the bridge was undergoing renovation.

== History ==
- July 28, 2004: phase 1 from Huangpu Road to Zongguan opened.
- July 29, 2010: phase 2 from Dijiao to Huangpu Road and from Zongguan to Dongwu Boulevard opened. Jianghan Road changed its name into Xunlimen.
- May 28, 2014: Hankou North extension opened.
- Sept 17, 2014: Zhuyehai opened.
- Dec 26, 2017: Extension to Jinghe opened.

Segment	Commencement	Length	Station(s)	Name
Huangpu Road — Zongguan	28 July 2004	9.769 km (6.07 mi)	10	Phase 1
Dijiao — Huangpu Road	29 July 2010	7.040 km (4.37 mi)	6	Phase 2
Zongguan — Dongwu Boulevard	29 July 2010	11.454 km (7.12 mi)	9	Phase 2
Hankou North — Dijiao	28 May 2014	5.555 km (3.45 mi)	3	Hankou North extension
Zhuyehai	17 September 2014	Infill station	1	
Dongwu Boulevard — Jinghe	26 December 2017	4.118 km (2.56 mi)	3	Jinghe North extension

== Stations ==
Phase 1 stations are (from west to east): Zongguan, Taipingyang, Qiaokoulu, Chongrenlu, Lijibeilu, Youyilu, Xunlimen (originally Jianghanlu, connection with future Line 2; not to confuse with the future Jianghanlu station of Line 2), Dazhilu, Sanyanglu, Huangpulu.

Line 1, Phase 2 stations from west to east are Jinshandadao (not open yet), Dongwudadao, Wuhuandadao, Etouwan, Zhuyehai, Duoluokou, Gutianyilu, Gutianerlu, Gutiansanlu, Gutiansilu and Hanxiyilu to the West of Zongguan and Toudaojie, Erqilu, Xuzhouxincun, Danshuichi, Xinrong (originally Chalukou) and Dijiao to the East of Huangpulu (station names changed according to official system map and schedule).

Stations on Line 1 were originally without platform barriers of any type, contrary to most other metro lines in China today. However, at an unspecified interval, half height platform gates are now being installed gradually.

Station name		Connections	Distance km		Location
English	Chinese	Connections	Distance km		Location
Hankou North	汉口北		0.000	0.000	Huangpi
Shekouxincheng	滠口新城		3.410	3.410	Huangpi
Tengzigang	滕子岗		1.120	4.530	Jiang'an
Dijiao	堤角		1.025	5.555	Jiang'an
Xinrong	新荣	Yangluo	1.165	6.720	Jiang'an
Danshuichi	丹水池	12 (OSI)	1.437	8.157	Jiang'an
Xuzhouxincun	徐州新村		1.525	9.682	Jiang'an
Erqi Road	二七路		0.795	10.477	Jiang'an
Toudao Street	头道街		0.915	11.392	Jiang'an
Huangpu Road	黄浦路	8	1.203	12.595	Jiang'an
Sanyang Road	三阳路	7	1.155	13.750	Jiang'an
Dazhi Road	大智路	6	1.010	14.760	Jiang'an
Xunlimen	循礼门	2	1.083	15.843	Jiang'an
Youyi Road	友谊路		0.986	16.829	Jianghan
Liji North Road	利济北路		0.888	17.717	Qiaokou
Chongren Road	崇仁路		0.880	18.597	Qiaokou
Qiaokou Road	硚口路		1.142	19.739	Qiaokou
Taipingyang	太平洋		1.045	20.784	Qiaokou
Zongguan	宗关	3	1.580	22.364	Qiaokou
Hanxi 1st Road	汉西一路		0.921	23.285	Qiaokou
Gutian 4th Road	古田四路		0.820	24.105	Qiaokou
Gutian 3rd Road	古田三路		0.795	24.900	Qiaokou
Gutian 2nd Road	古田二路		0.907	25.807	Qiaokou
Gutian 1st Road	古田一路		1.518	27.325	Qiaokou
Duoluokou	舵落口		1.435	28.760	Qiaokou
Zhuyehai	竹叶海		0.807	29.567	Qiaokou
Etouwan	额头湾		0.944	30.511	Qiaokou
Wuhuan Boulevard	五环大道		1.655	32.166	Dongxihu
Dongwu Boulevard	东吴大道		1.652	33.818	Dongxihu
Matoutan Park	码头潭公园	6	1.037	34.855	Dongxihu
Sandian	三店		1.971	36.826	Dongxihu
Jinghe	径河		1.110	37.936	Dongxihu

All translation of station names are according to official translation.

== Operation ==
Beginning May 28, 2014, every other train will reach Hankou North Station as the northern terminus; others will terminate at Dijiao Station.

== Rolling stock ==
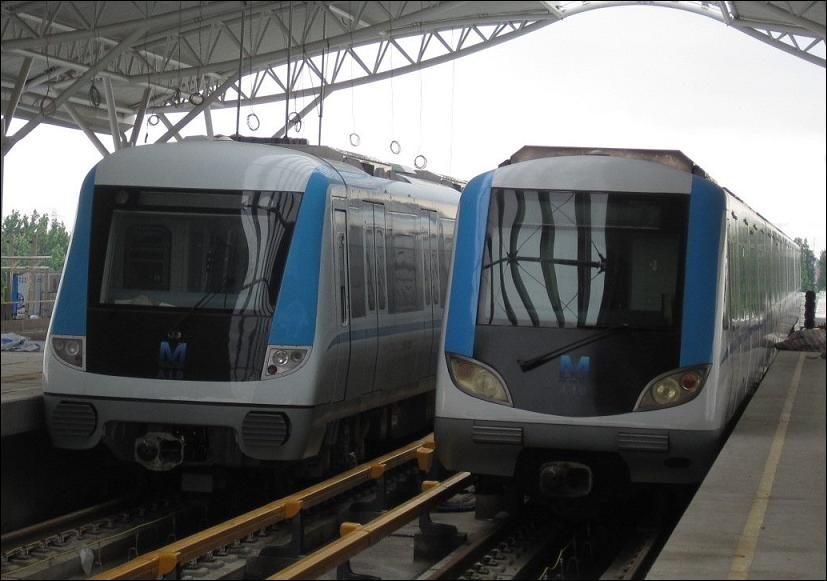
Left: Phase 2 rolling stock. Right: Phase 1 rolling stock.

Type	Time of manufacturing	Lines operated	Cars	Assembly	Notes
Type B	200?–2004	Line 1, Wuhan Metro	48	Tc+M+M+Tc	Manufactured by Changchun Railway Vehicles.
Type B	2010–2011	Line 1, Wuhan Metro	84	Tc+M+M+Tc	Manufactured by Zhuzhou Electric Locomotive Co., Ltd.

The rolling stock for Line 1 is a uses 4 car Type B trains, with 100 km/h (62 mph) of max speed, 80 km/h (50 mph) of operation max speed, and 36.6 km/h (23 mph) average speed. Traction power is provided by a third rail collected by bottom contact contact shoes on the train. A full train provides 176 seats, and can carry 1,276 passengers by Chinese regulation of 9 people per square meter.
