= Qiaokou, Wuhan =

Qiaokou 硚口区
- District
- Location in Hubei
- Coordinates: 30°35′46″N 114°13′05″E
- Country: People's Republic of China
- Province: Hubei
- Sub-provincial city: Wuhan
- Subdistricts: 11

Area
  - Total: 46.39 km^{2} (17.91 sq mi)

Population (2020 census)
  - Total: 666,661
  - Density: 14,370/km^{2} (37,220/sq mi)
- Time zone: UTC+8 (China Standard)
- Website: www.qiaokou.gov.cn

Qiaokou, Wuhan
- Traditional Chinese: 礄口區
- Simplified Chinese: 硚口区
- Literal meaning: "Qiao Mouth District"
Transcriptions
Standard Mandarin
- Hanyu Pinyin: Qiáokǒu Qū

Qiaokou District (Chinese: 硚口区; pinyin: Qiáokǒu Qū) is one of 13 urban districts of the prefecture-level city of Wuhan, the capital of Hubei Province, China. It is situated on the northern (left) bank of the Han River.

Along with Dongxihu, it is the only district of Wuhan to not have any shoreline along the Yangtze River, and it borders Dongxihu to the north, Jianghan to the east, and Hanyang to the south across the Han River. 'Qiaokou' is used as an example of the usage of the rarely used character 礄/硚 in the Contemporary Chinese Dictionary. It is said that the character 'qiao' refers to stone bridges constructed over the Han River in the Late Qing. The district is part of the historical Hankou.

== Geography ==
=== Administrative divisions ===
As of 2017, Qiaokou District was divided into eleven subdistricts:

#	Name	Chinese (S)	Hanyu Pinyin	English Meaning	Population (2010)	Area (km^{2})(2016)
Subdistricts
1	Yijia Subdistrict	易家街道	Yìjiā Jiēdào	Yi Family	86,627	9.2
2	Gutian Subdistrict	古田街道	Gǔtián Jiēdào	Old Field		5.5
3	Changfeng Subdistrict	长丰街道	Chángfēng Jiēdào	Perennial harvest	179,152	10.9
4	Hanjiadun Subdistrict	韩家墩街道	Hánjiādūn Jiēdào	Han's Family pier	94,340	4.59
5	Zongguan Subdistrict	宗关街道	Zōngguān Jiēdào	Zong Guan	64,649	4.7
6	Hanshuiqiao Subdistrict	汉水桥街道	Hànshuǐqiáo Jiēdào	Hanshui Bridge	71,776	2.35
7	Baofeng Subdistrict	宝丰街道	Bǎofēng Jiēdào	Treasure abundant	56,647	2.31
8	Ronghua Subdistrict	荣华街道	Rónghuá Jiēdào	Prosperity	50,592	0.82
9	Hanzhong Subdistrict	汉中街道	Hànzhōng Jiēdào	Hanzhong	29,597	1.28
10	Liujiaoting Subdistrict	六角亭街道	Liùjiǎotíng Jiēdào	Six Corner Pavilion	46,285	0.93
11	Hanzheng Subdistrict	汉正街道	Hànzhèng Jiēdào	Hanzheng	113,975	1.67
former	Chongren Subdistrict	崇仁街道	Chóngrén Jiēdào	Venerate Benevolence	36,025	
