= Hankou North station =

Wuhan Metro station

Hankou North 汉口北 1
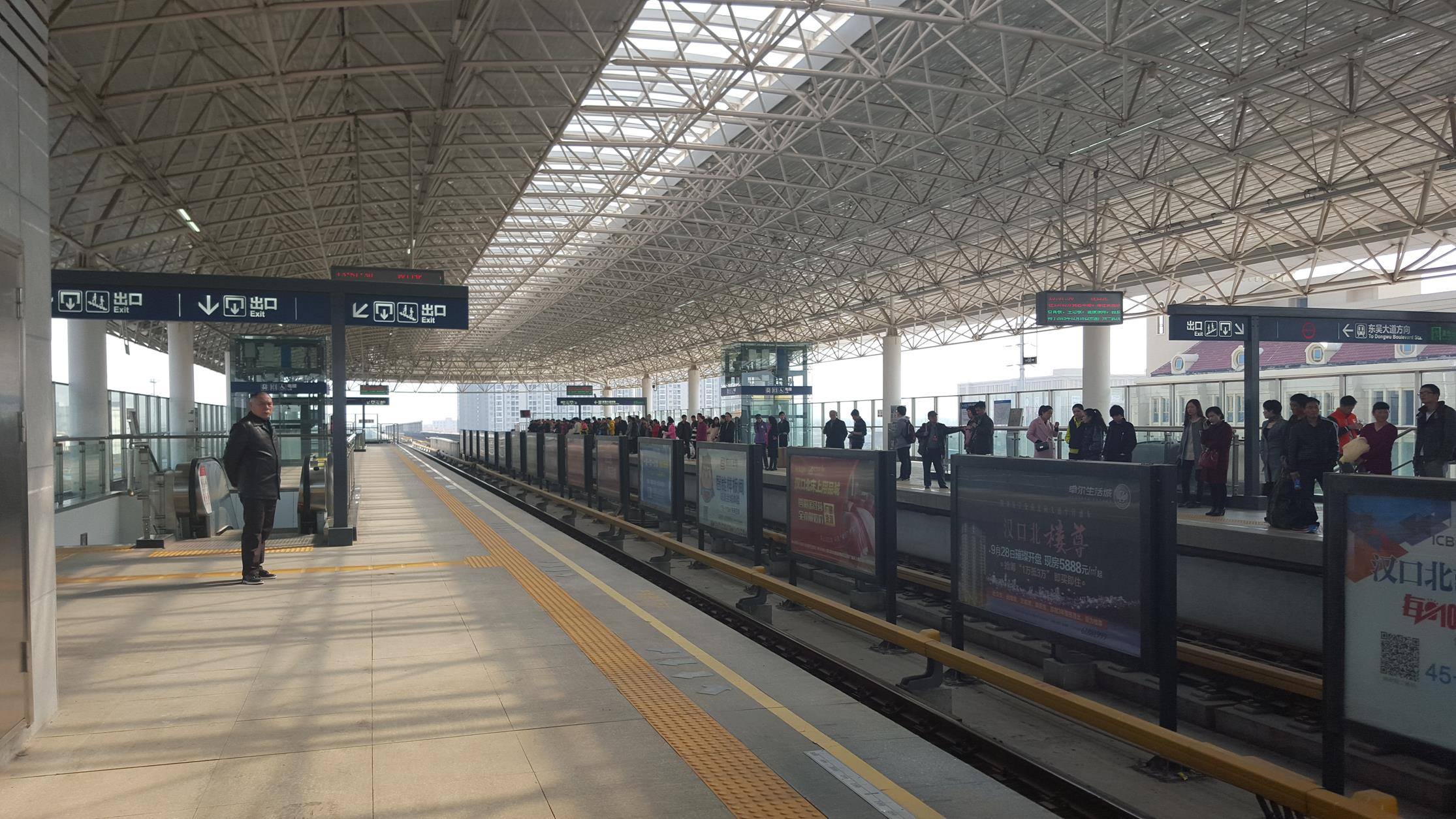
- Hankou North station in February 2016

General information
- Location: Huangpi District, Wuhan, Hubei; China
- Coordinates: 30.7144°N 114.3239°E
- Operated by: Wuhan Metro Co., Ltd
- Line: Line 1
- Platforms: 2 (2 side platforms)

Construction
- Structure type: Elevated

Other information
- Station code: 101

History
- Opened: May 28, 2014; 12 years ago (Line 1)

Services
Preceding station	Wuhan Metro	Following station
Shekouxincheng towards Jinghe	Line 1	Terminus
Location

Hankou North Station (Chinese: 汉口北站) is the current eastern terminus of Line 1 of Wuhan Metro. It entered revenue service on May 28, 2014. It is located in Huangpi District.

== Station layout ==
3F	Side platform, doors open on the right
3F	Westbound	← Line 1 towards Jinghe (Shekouxincheng)
3F	Eastbound	Line 1 termination platform →
3F	Side platform, doors open on the right
2F	Concourse	Faregates, Station Agent
G	Entrances and Exits
