= Jinghe station =

Wuhan Metro station

Jinghe 径河 metro
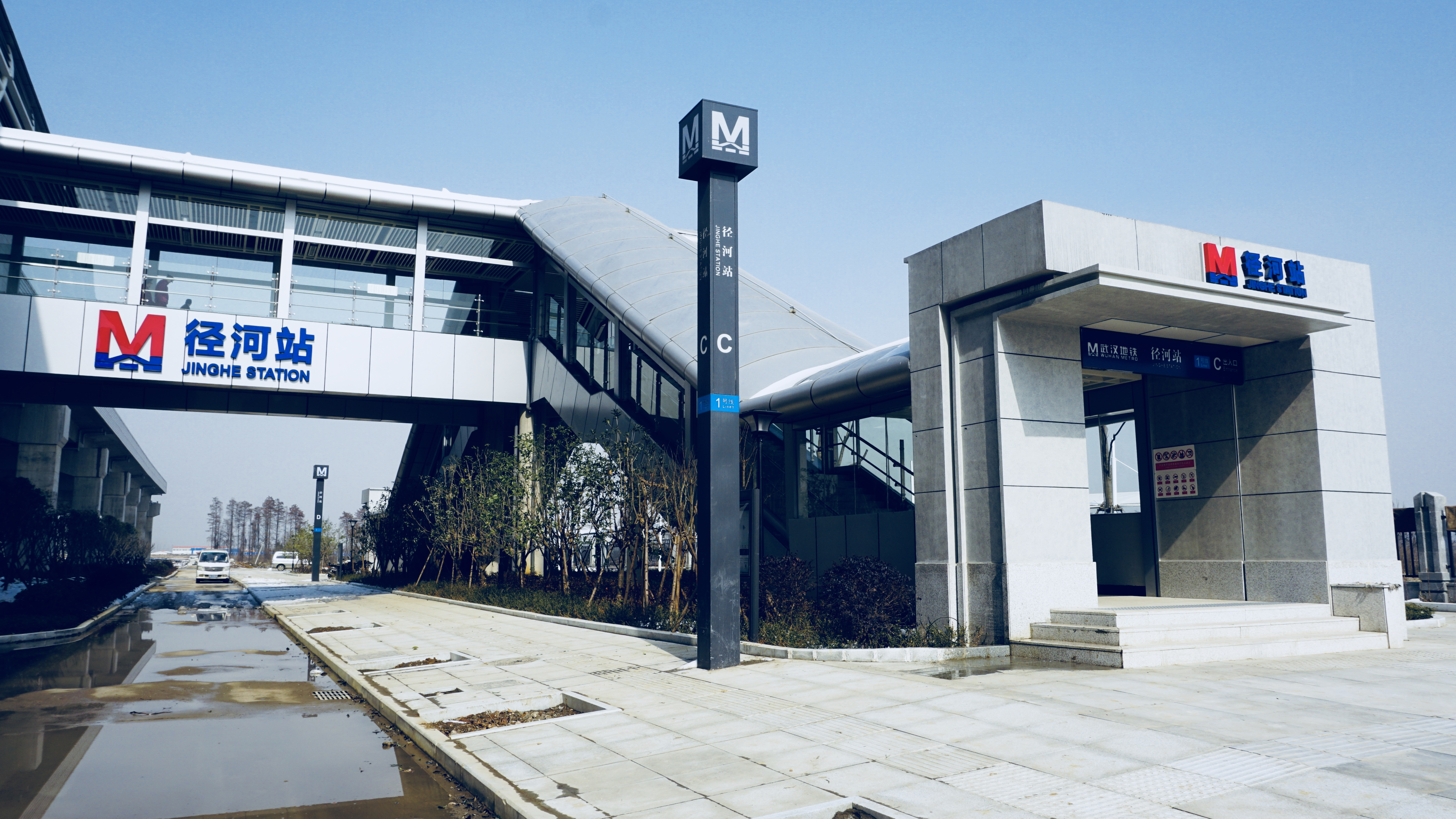

General information
- Location: Dongxihu District, Wuhan, Hubei; China
- Operated by: Wuhan Metro Co., Ltd
- Line: Line 1
- Platforms: 2 (1 island platform)

Construction
- Structure type: Elevated

History
- Opened: December 26, 2017; 8 years ago (Line 1)

Services
Preceding station	Wuhan Metro	Following station
Terminus	Line 1	Sandian towards Hankou North
Location

Jinghe Station (Chinese: 径河站) is a station on Line 1 of the Wuhan Metro and it is the western terminus of Line 1. It entered revenue service on December 26, 2017. It is located in Dongxihu District.

== Station layout ==
3F	Westbound	← Line 1 termination platform
3F	Side platform, doors open on the right
3F	Eastbound	Line 1 towards Hankou North (Sandian) →
2F	Concourse	Faregates, Station Agent
G	Entrances and Exits
