= Yezhihu station =

Metro station in Wuhan, China

Yezhihu 野芷湖 metro
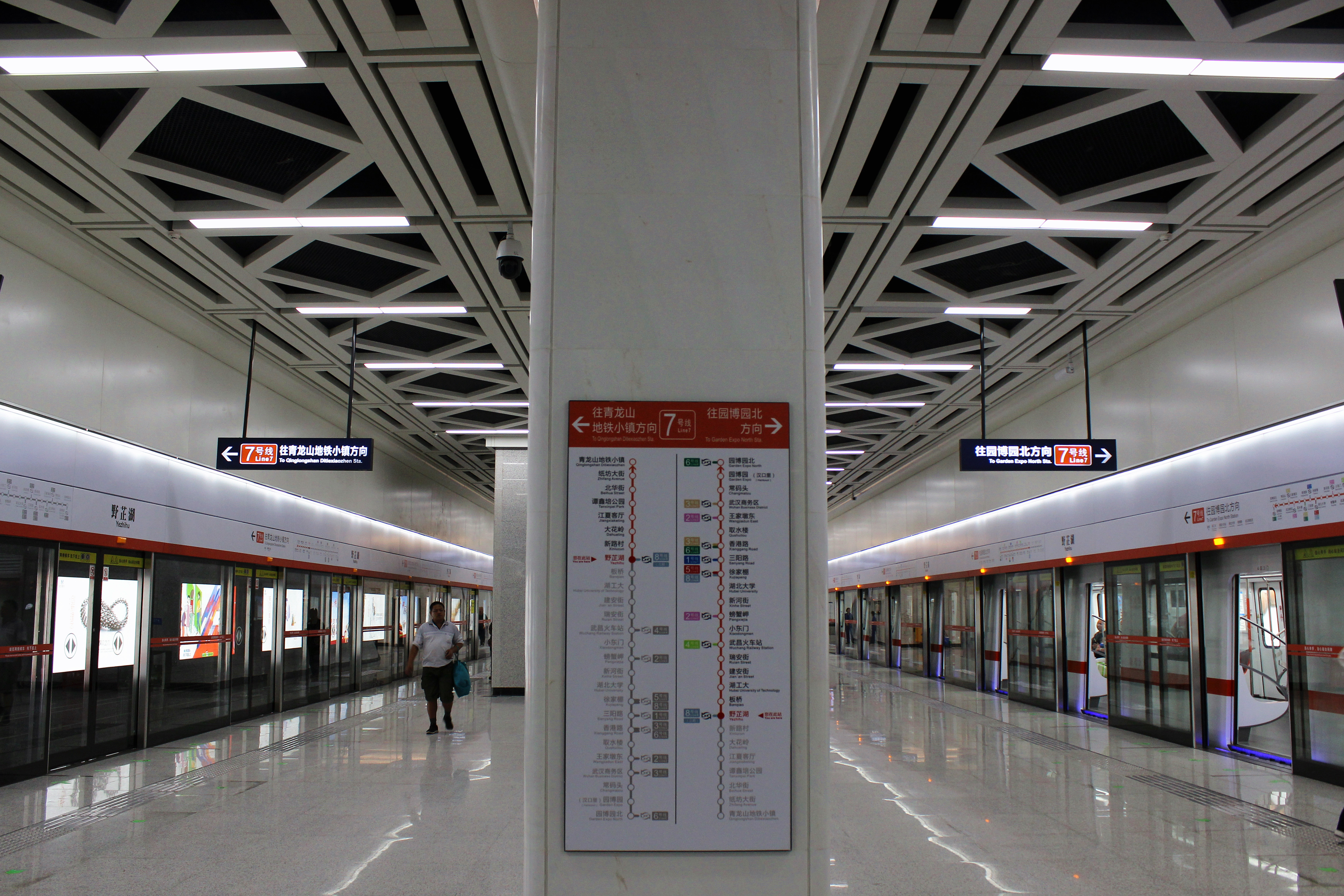
- Line 7 platform

General information
- Location: Hongshan District, Wuhan, Hubei; China
- Operator: Wuhan Metro Co., Ltd
- Lines: Line 7; Line 8
- Platforms: 4 (2 side platforms, 1 island platform)

Construction
- Structure type: Underground

History
- Opened: October 1, 2018 (Line 7); November 6, 2019 (Line 8)

Services
Preceding station	Wuhan Metro	Following station
Banqiao towards Huangpi Square	Line 7	Xinlucun towards Qinglongshan Ditiexiaozhen
Mahu towards Jintan Road	Line 8	Huangjiahu Ditiexiaozhen towards Military Athletes' Village
Location

Yezhihu Station (Chinese: 野芷湖站) is a transfer station on Line 7 and Line 8 of the Wuhan Metro. It entered revenue service on October 1, 2018. It is located in Hongshan District.

== Station layout ==
G	Concourse	Faregates, Station Agent, Exits A-D
B1	Northbound	← Line 7 towards Huangpi Square (Banqiao)
B1	Island platform, doors will open on the left
B1	Southbound	Line 7 towards Qinglongshan Ditiexiaozhen (Xinlucun) →
B2	Side platform, doors will open on the right
B2	Northbound	← Line 8 towards Jintan Road (Mahu)
B2	Southbound	Line 8 towards Military Athletes' Village (Huangjiahu Ditiexiaozhen) →
B2	Side platform, doors will open on the right
