= Yuejiazui station =

Metro station in Wuhan, China

Yuejiazui 岳家嘴 metro
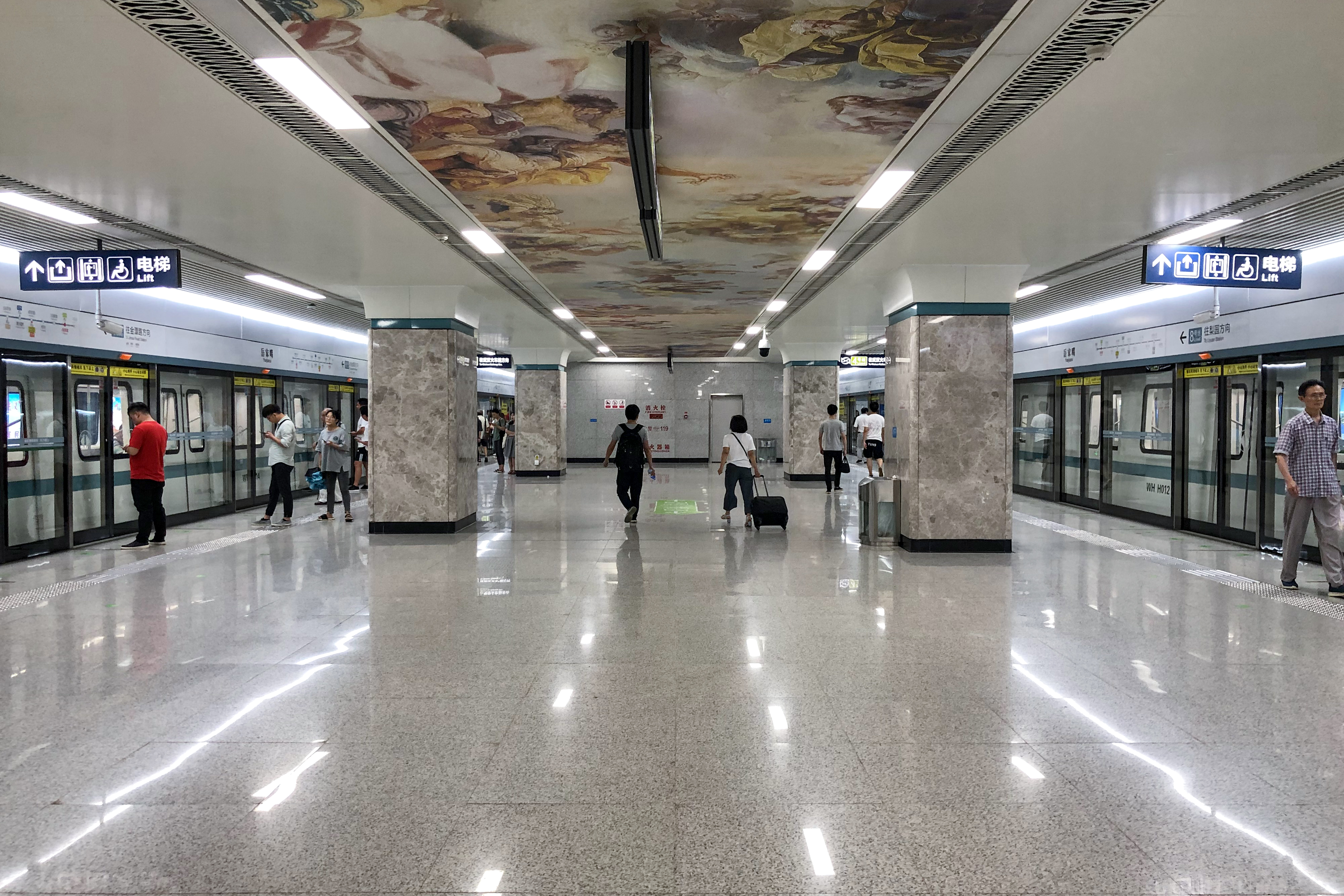

General information
- Location: Wuchang District, Wuhan, Hubei; China
- Operated by: Wuhan Metro Co., Ltd
- Lines: Line 4; Line 8
- Platforms: 4 (2 side platforms, 1 island platform)

Construction
- Structure type: Underground

History
- Opened: December 28, 2013 (Line 4); December 26, 2017 (Line 8)

Services
| Preceding station | Wuhan Metro | Following station |
|---|---|---|
| Dongting towards Bailin | Line 4 | Tieji Road towards Wuhan Railway Station |
| Wangjiadun towards Jintan Road | Line 8 | Liyuan towards Military Athletes' Village |
Location

Yuejiazui Station (Chinese: 岳家嘴站) is a transfer station of Line 4 and Line 8 of the Wuhan Metro. It entered revenue service on December 28, 2013. It is located in Wuchang District.

== Station layout ==
| G | Entrances and Exits | Exits A-H, J, K |
| B1 | Concourse | Faregates, Station Agent |
| B1 | Side platform, doors will open on the right |
| B1 | Westbound | ← Line 4 towards Bailin (Dongting) |
| B1 | Eastbound | Line 4 towards Wuhan Railway Station (Tieji Road) → |
| B1 | Side platform, doors will open on the right |
| B1 | Concourse | Faregates, Station Agent |
| B2 | Northbound | ← Line 8 towards Jintan Road (Wangjiadun) |
| B2 | Island platform, doors will open on the left |
| B2 | Southbound | Line 8 towards Military Athletes' Village (Liyuan) → |

== Gallery ==
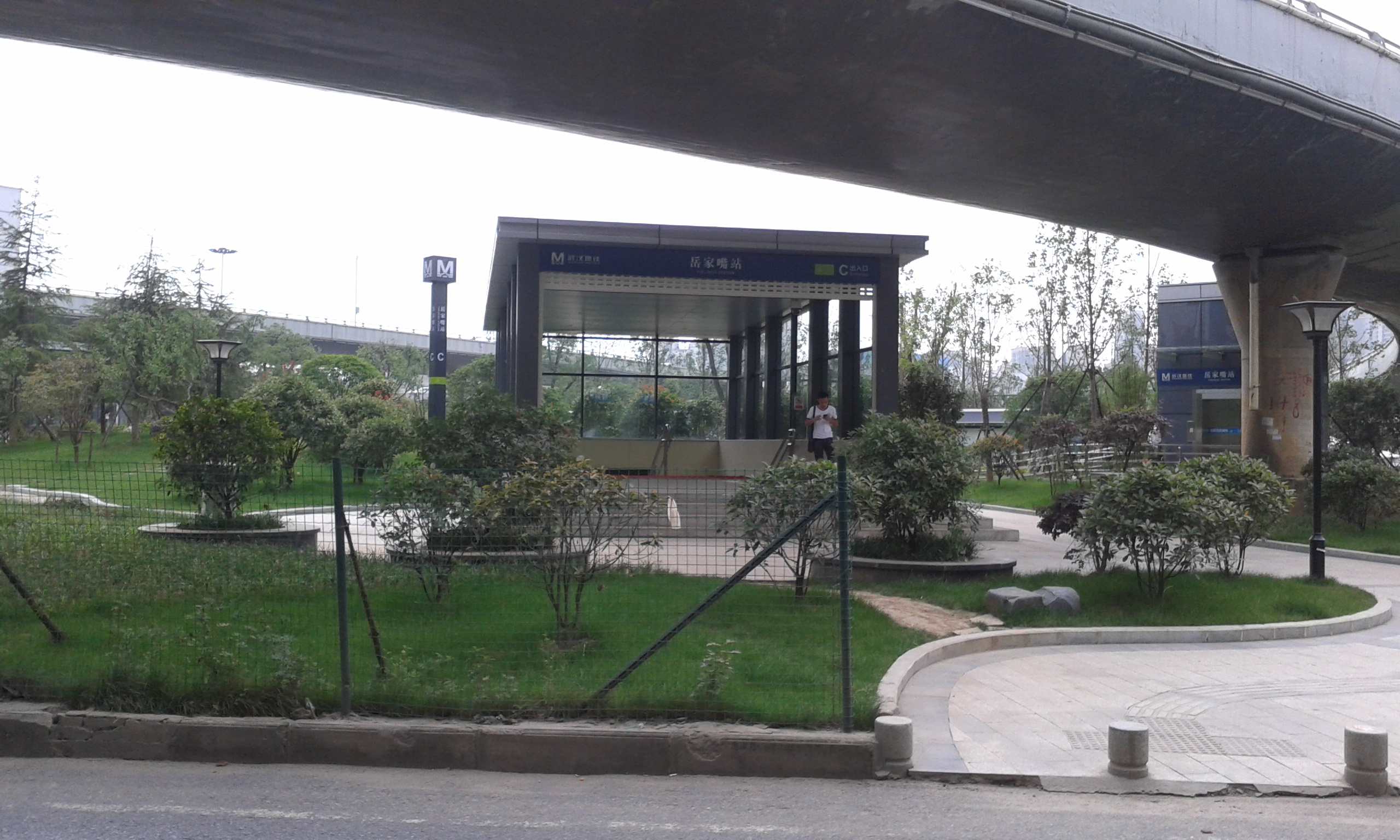
Entrance C

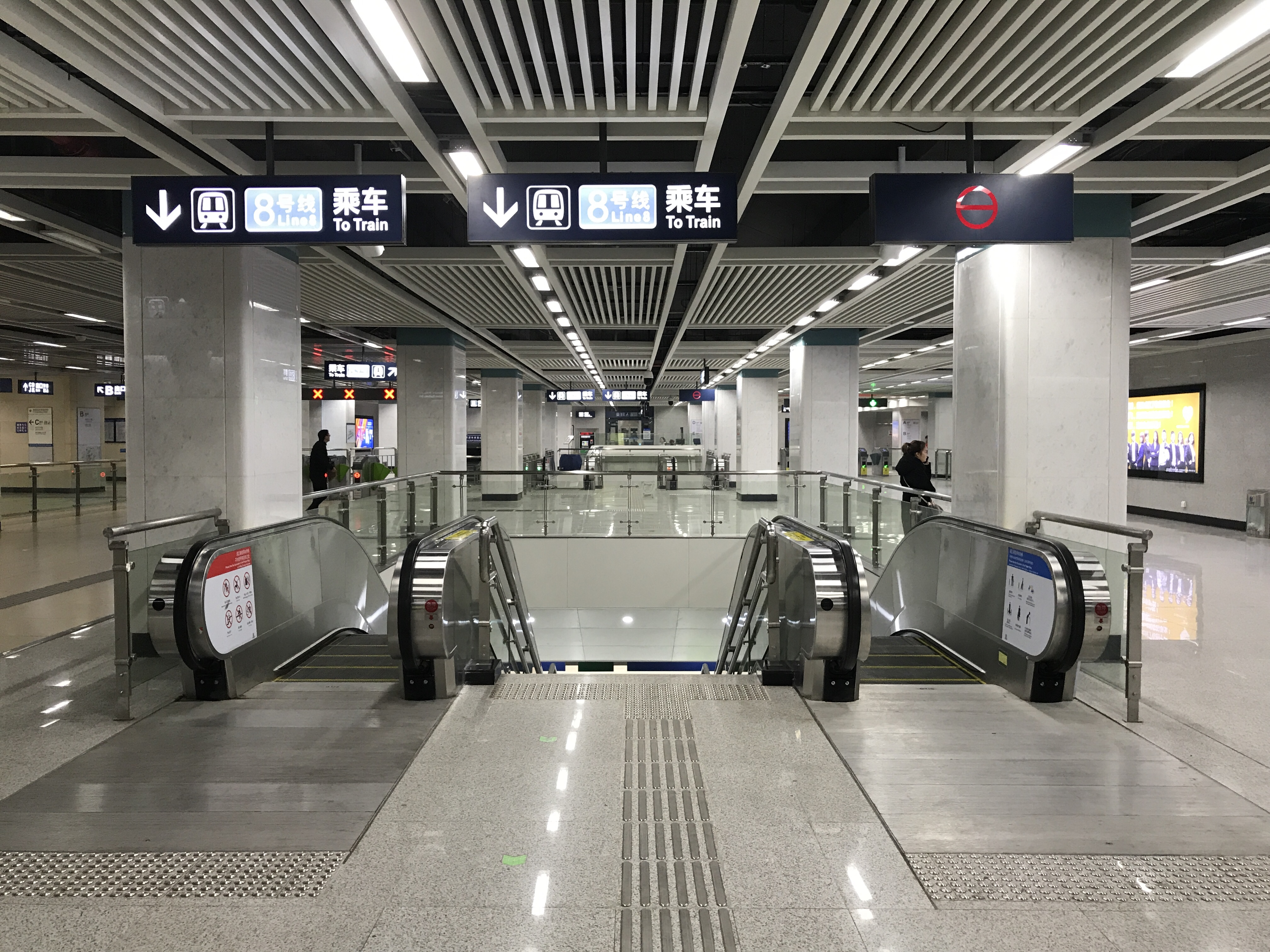
Concourse

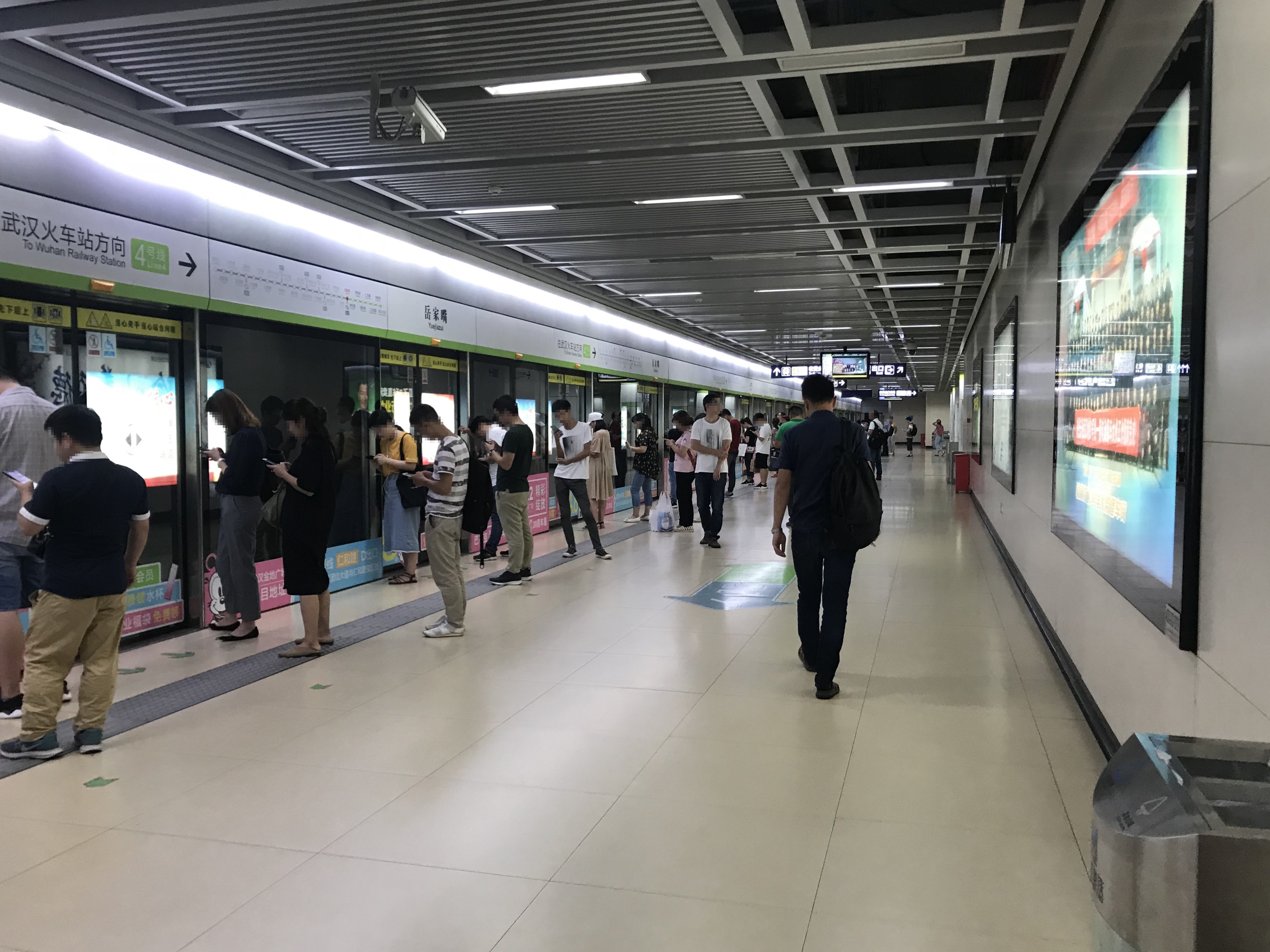
Line 4 platform

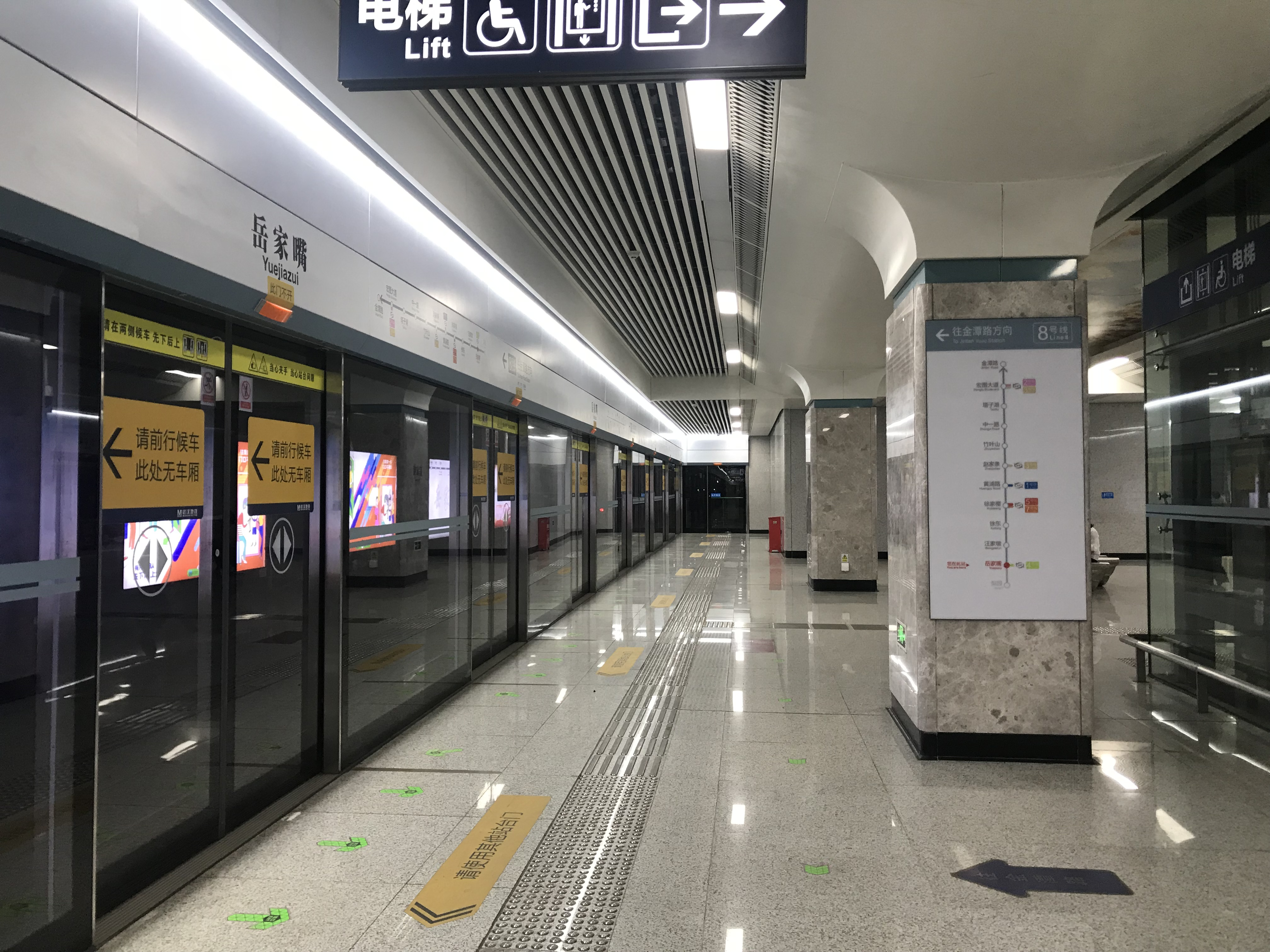
Line 8 platform
