= Zhaojiatiao station =

Metro station in Wuhan, China

Zhaojiatiao 赵家条 metro
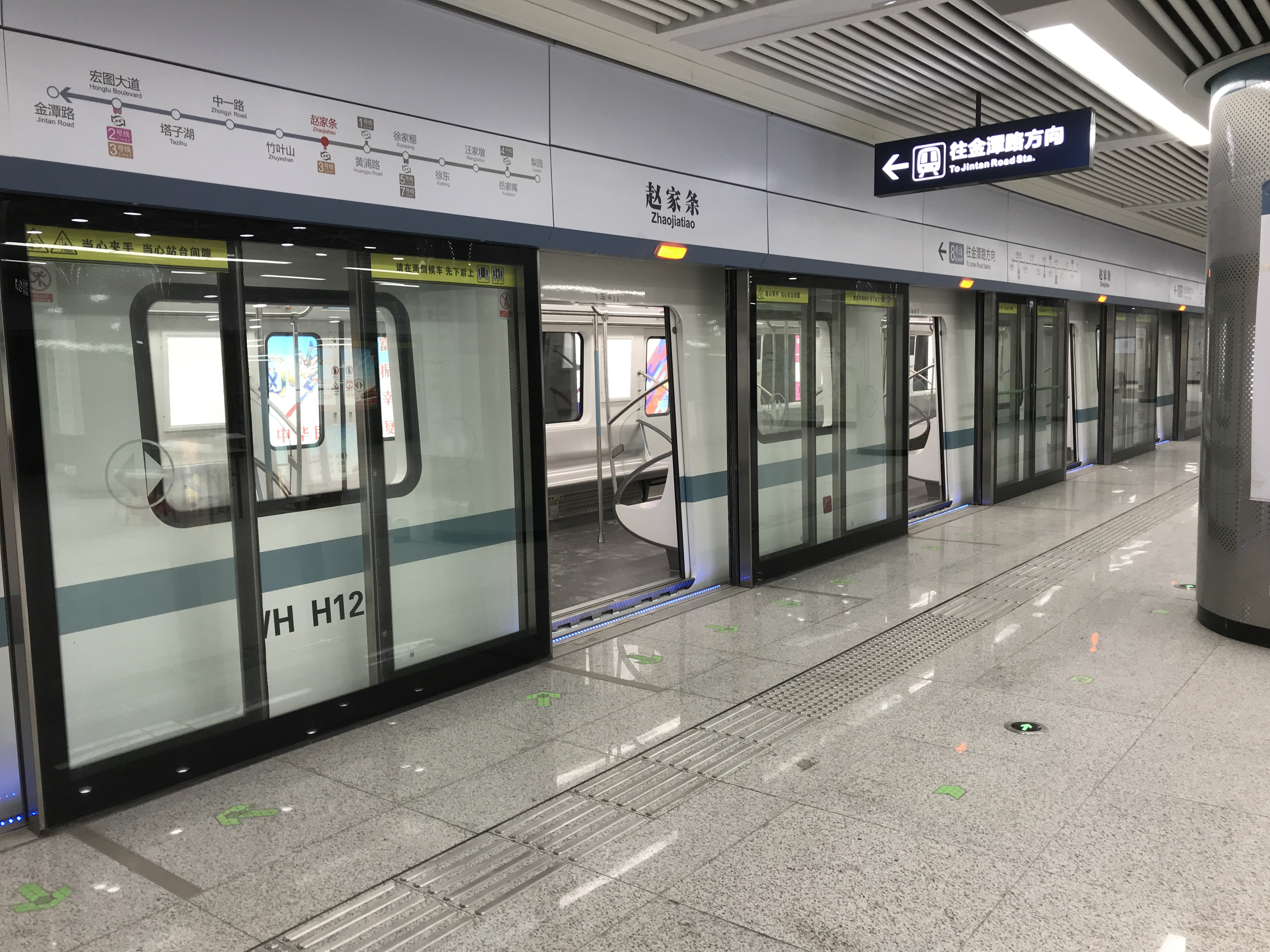

General information
- Location: Jiang'an District, Wuhan, Hubei; China
- Coordinates: 30.620566°N 114.291629°E
- Operated by: Wuhan Metro Co., Ltd
- Lines: Line 3; Line 8
- Platforms: 4 (2 island platforms)

Construction
- Structure type: Underground

History
- Opened: December 28, 2015 (Line 3); December 26, 2017 (Line 8)

Services
Preceding station	Wuhan Metro	Following station
Luojiazhuang towards Hongtu Boulevard	Line 3	Huiji 2nd Road towards Zhuanyang Boulevard
Zhuyeshan towards Jintan Road	Line 8	Huangpu Road towards Military Athletes' Village
Location

Zhaojiatiao Station (Chinese: 赵家条站) is a transfer station on the Wuhan Metro. It entered revenue service on December 28, 2015. It is located in Jiang'an District. The station is an interchange station of Line 3 and Line 8.

== Station layout ==
G	Entrances and Exits	Exits A-D, G
B1	Concourse	Faregates, Station Agent
B2	Northbound	← Line 3 towards Hongtu Boulevard (Luojiazhuang)
B2	Island platform, doors will open on the left
B2	Southbound	Line 3 towards Zhuanyang Boulevard (Huiji 2nd Road) →
B3	Northbound	← Line 8 towards Jintan Road (Zhuyeshan)
B3	Island platform, doors will open on the left
B3	Southbound	Line 8 towards Military Athletes' Village (Huangpu Road) →

== Gallery ==
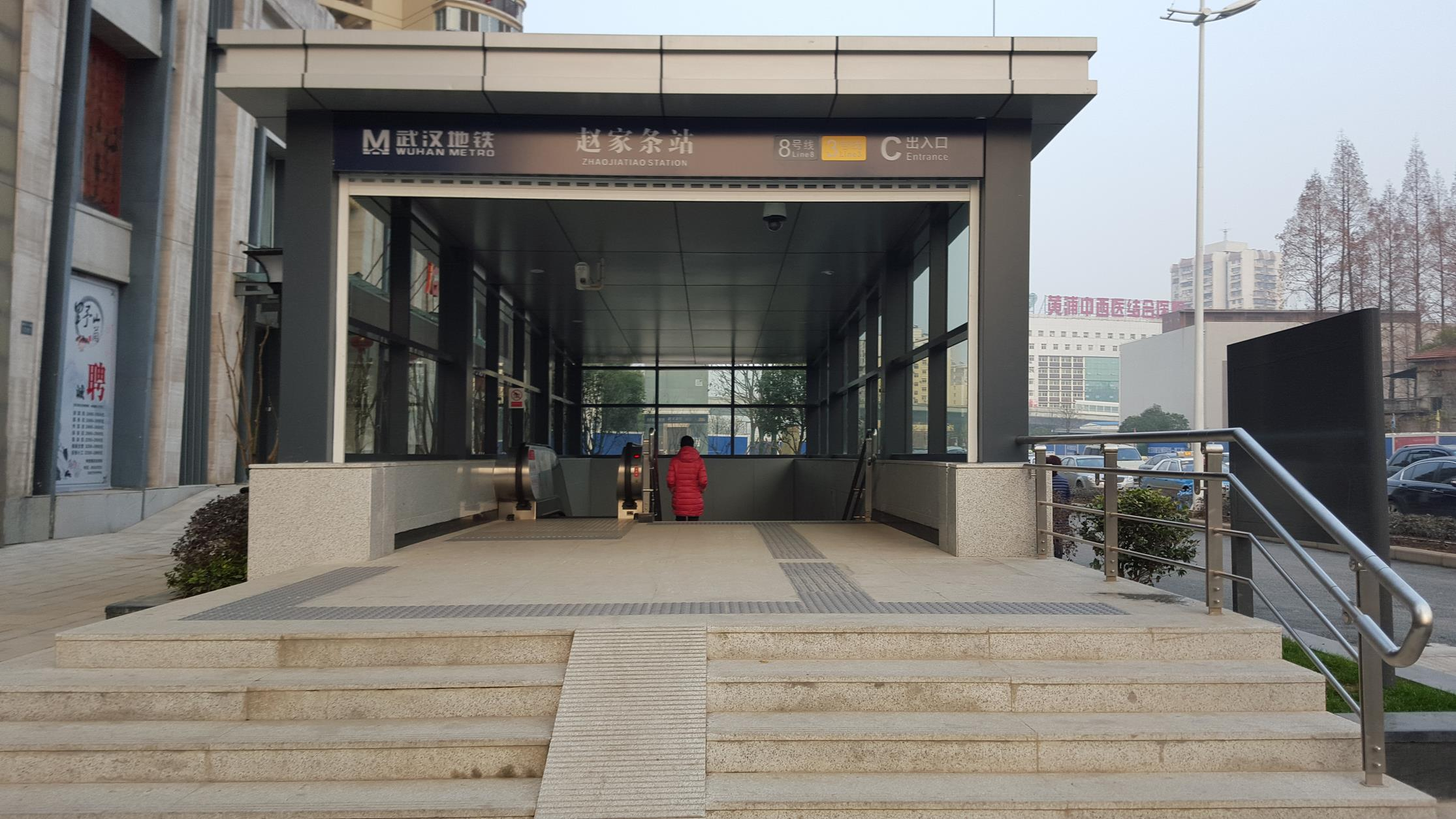
Entrance C

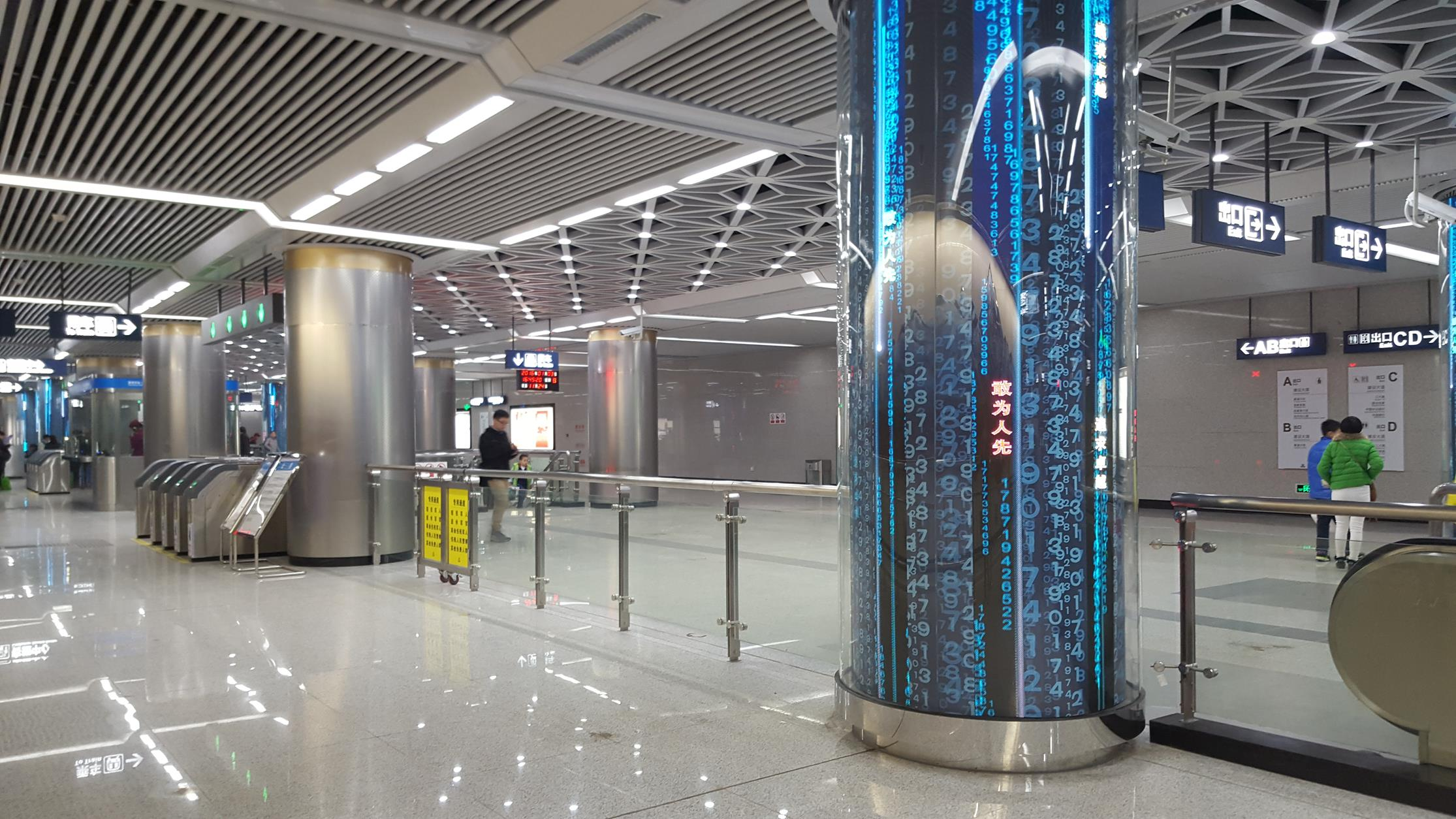
Concourse

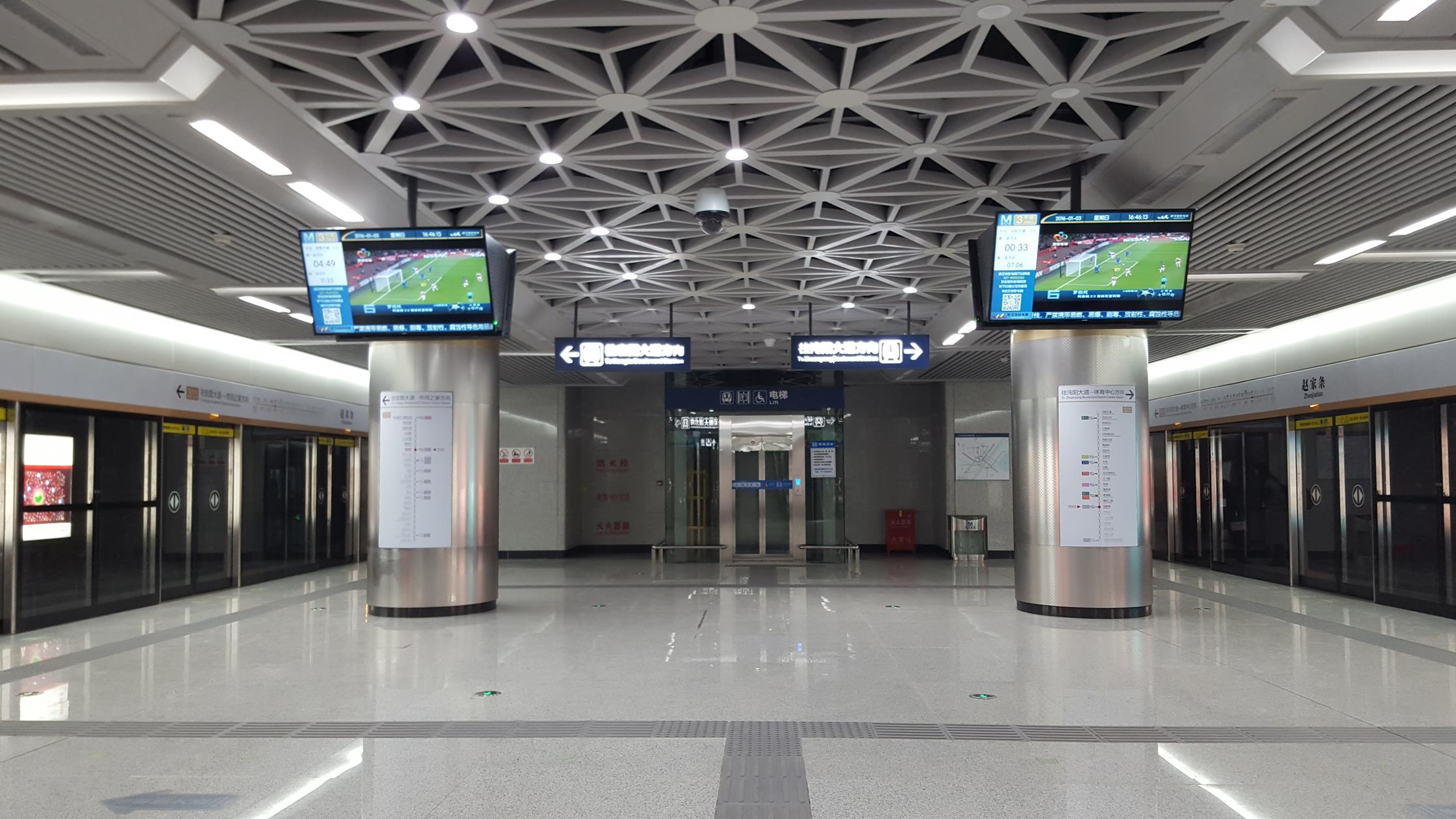
Line 3 platform

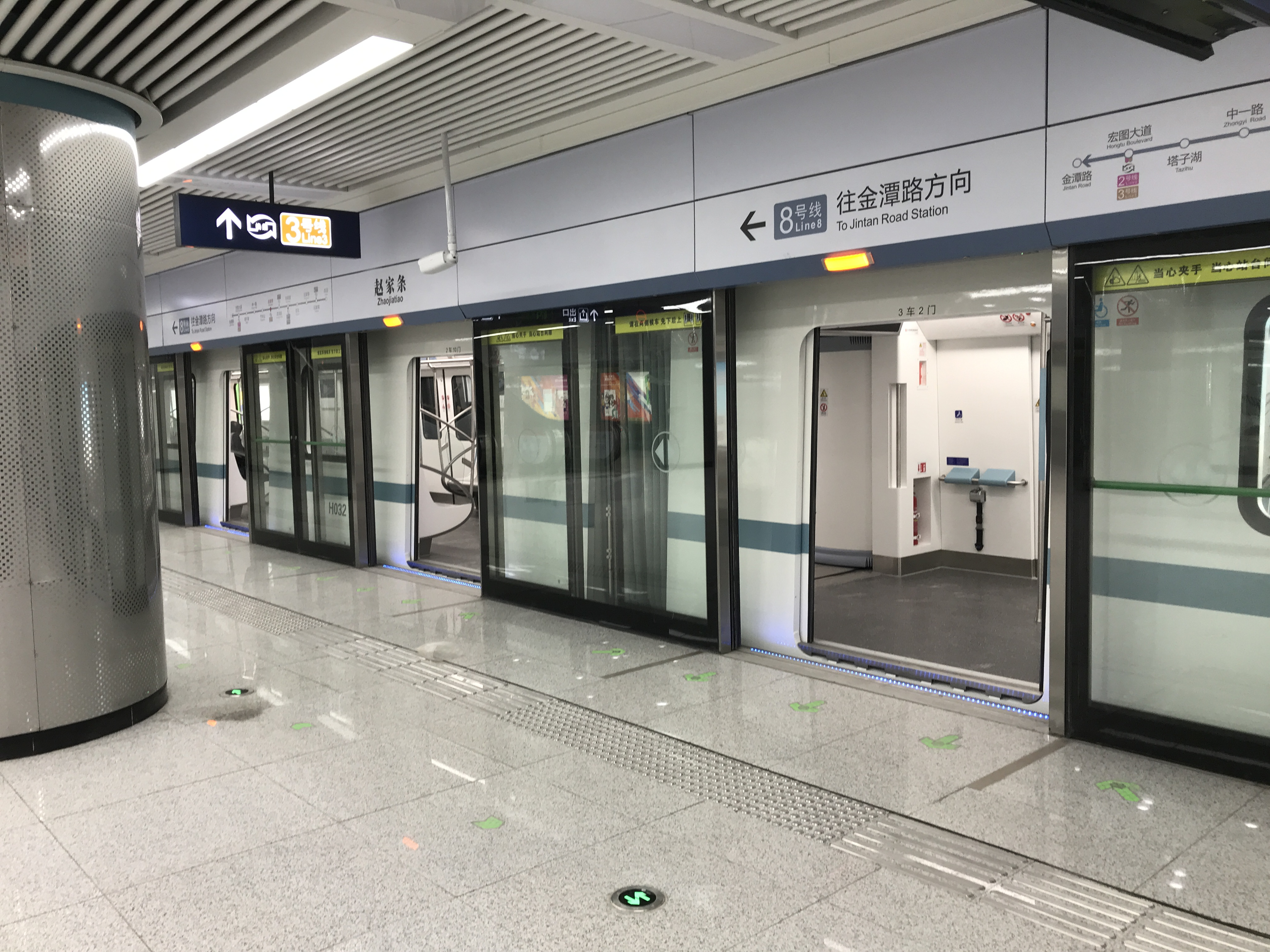
Line 8 platform
