= Tazihu station =

Metro station in Wuhan, China

Tazihu 塔子湖 metro
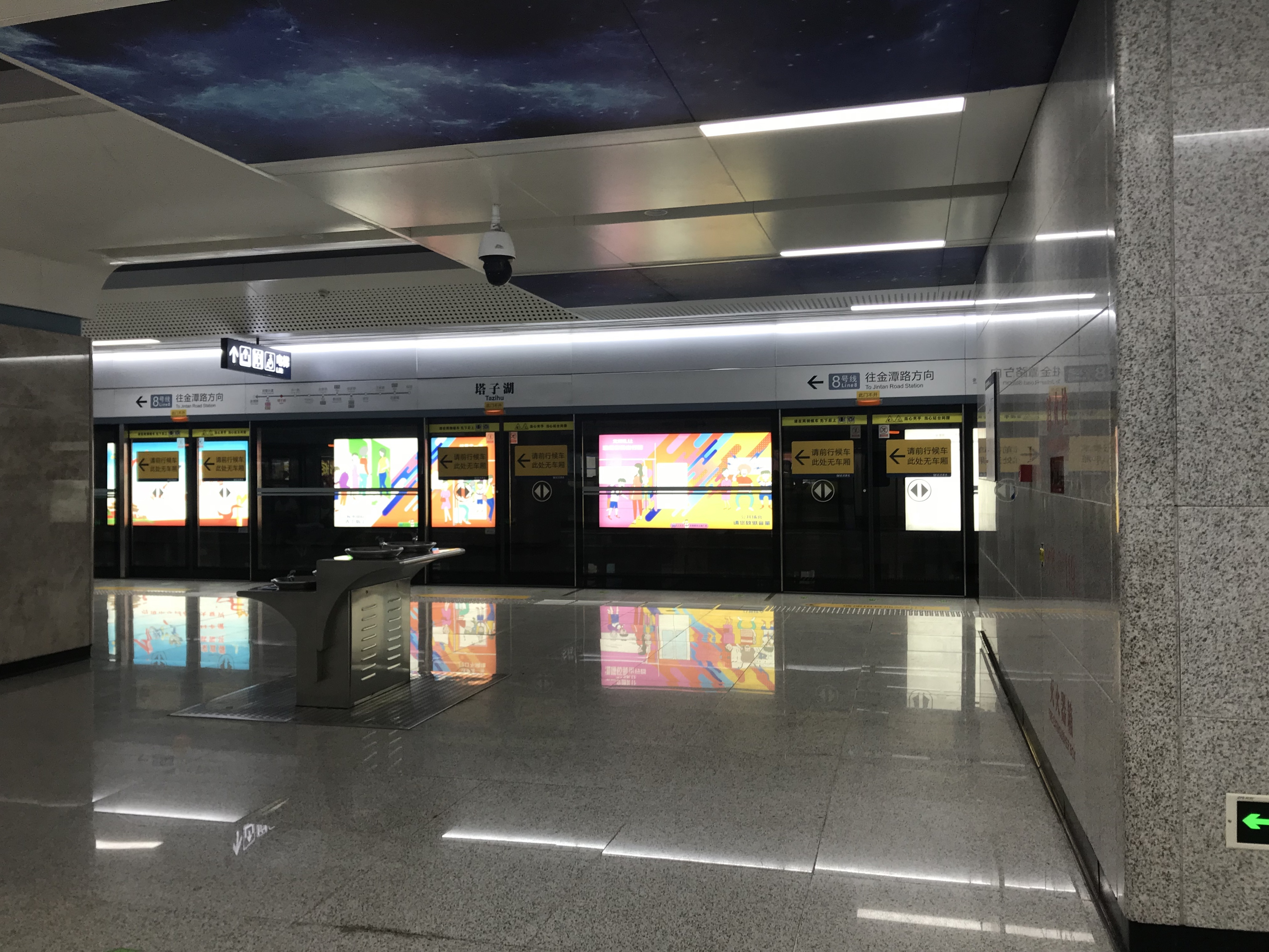

General information
- Location: Jiang'an District, Wuhan, Hubei; China
- Operator: Wuhan Metro Co., Ltd
- Line: Line 8
- Platforms: 2 (1 island platform)

Construction
- Structure type: Underground

History
- Opened: December 26, 2017 (Line 8)

Services
Preceding station	Wuhan Metro	Following station
Hongtu Boulevard towards Jintan Road	Line 8	Zhongyi Road towards Military Athletes' Village
Location

Tazihu Station (Chinese: 塔子湖站) is a station on Line 8 of the Wuhan Metro. It entered revenue service on December 26, 2017. It is located in Jiang'an District.

== Station layout ==
G	Entrances and Exits
B1	Concourse	Faregates, Station Agent
B2	Northbound	← Line 8 towards Jintan Road (Hongtu Boulevard)
B2	Island platform, doors will open on the left
B2	Southbound	Line 8 towards Military Athletes' Village (Zhongyi Road) →
