= Xudong station =

Metro station in Wuhan, China

Xudong 徐东 metro
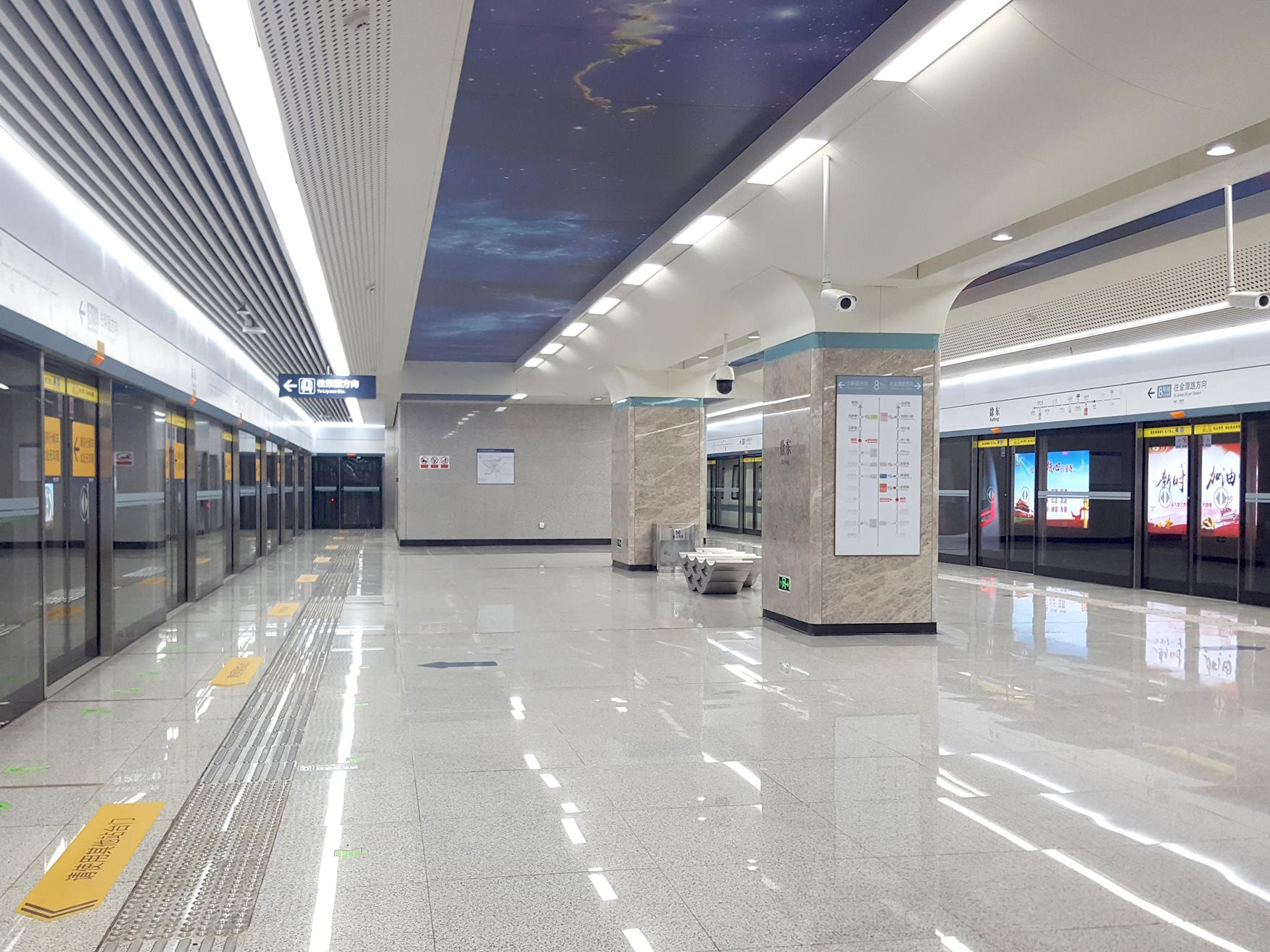

General information
- Location: Wuchang District, Wuhan, Hubei; China
- Coordinates: 30.59042°N 114.34017°E
- Operated by: Wuhan Metro Co., Ltd
- Line: Line 8
- Platforms: 2 (1 island platform)

Construction
- Structure type: Underground

History
- Opened: December 26, 2017 (Line 8)

Services
Preceding station	Wuhan Metro	Following station
Xujiapeng towards Jintan Road	Line 8	Wangjiadun towards Military Athletes' Village
Location

Xudong Station (Chinese: 徐东站) is a station on Line 8 of the Wuhan Metro. It entered revenue service on December 26, 2017. The station is located in Wuchang District.

== Station layout ==
G	Entrances and Exits	Exits A-D
B1	Concourse	Faregates, Station Agent
B2	Northbound	← Line 8 towards Jintan Road (Xujiapeng)
B2	Island platform, doors will open on the left
B2	Southbound	Line 8 towards Military Athletes' Village (Wangjiadun) →

== Gallery ==
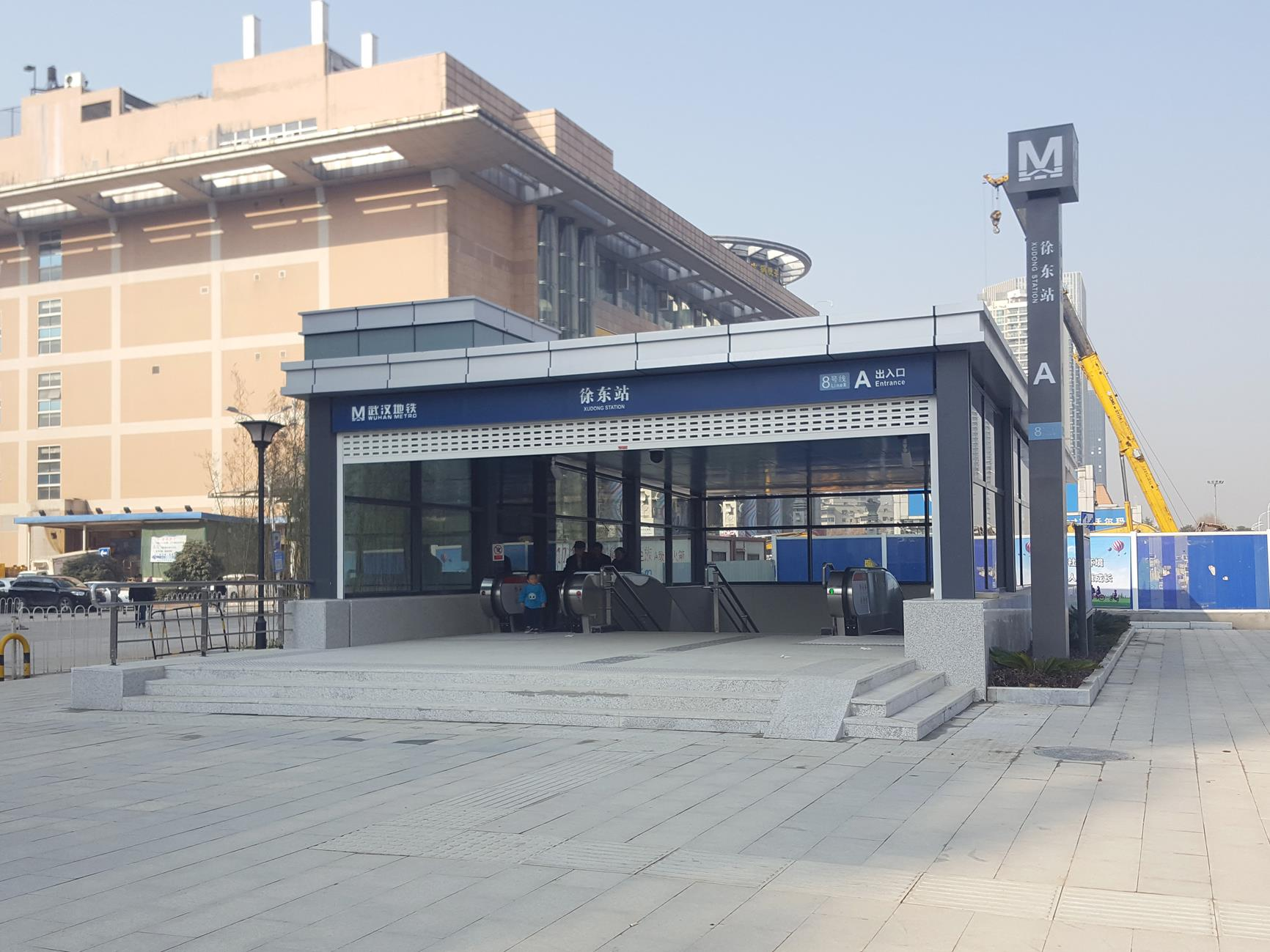
Entrance A

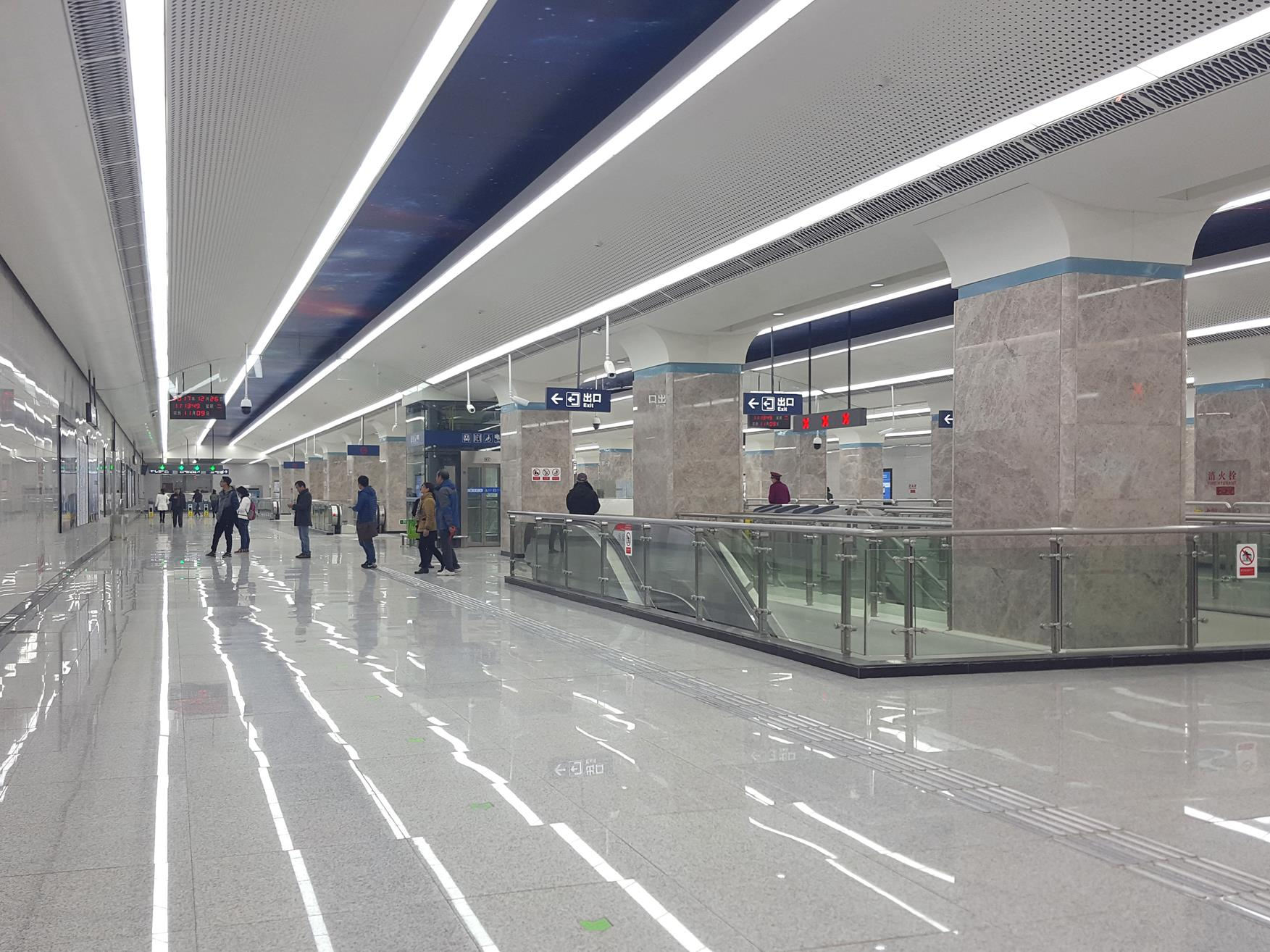
Concourse
