= Wangjiadun station =

Metro station in Wuhan, China

Wangjiadun 汪家墩 metro
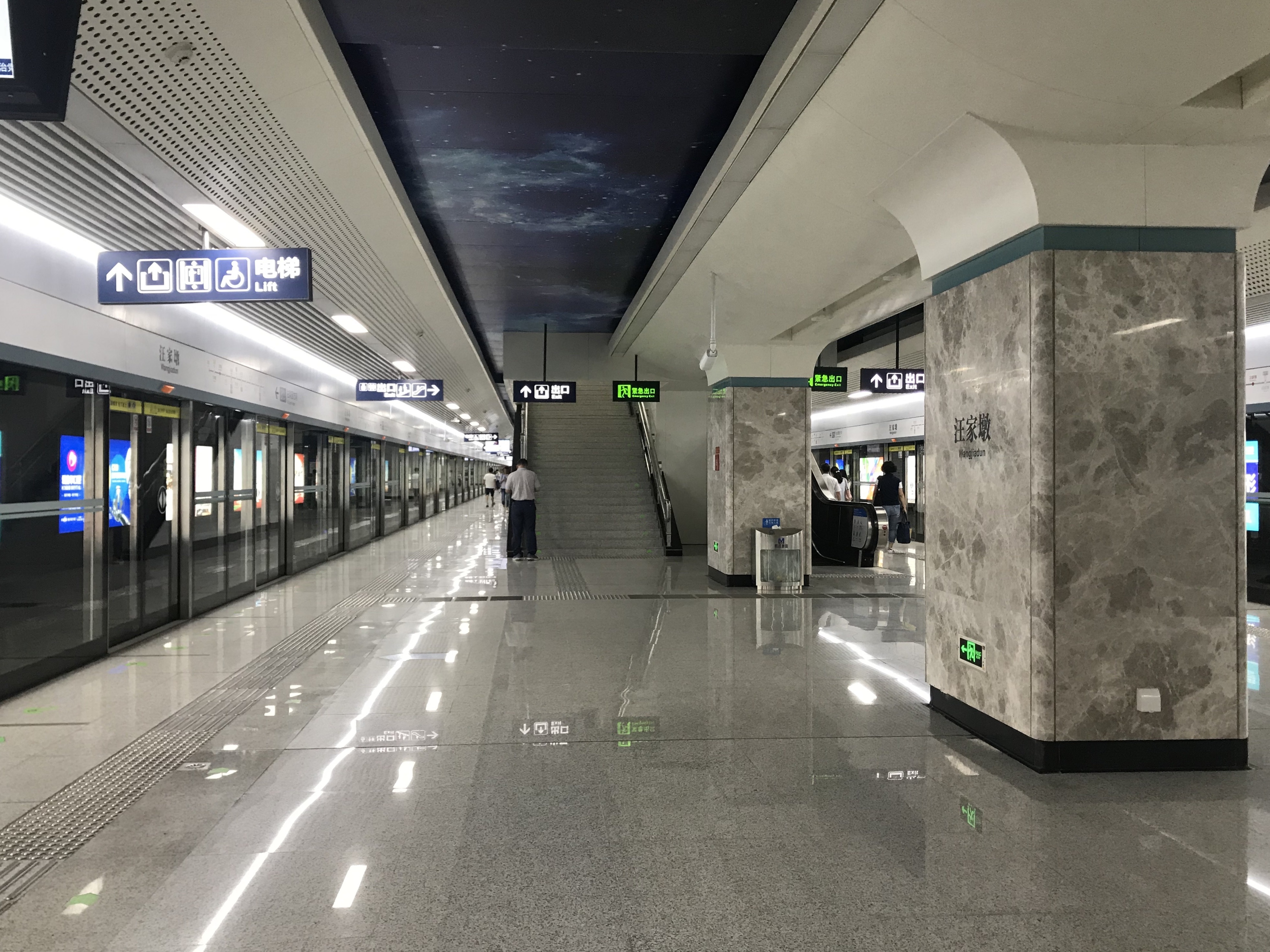

General information
- Location: Hongshan District, Wuhan, Hubei; China
- Operator: Wuhan Metro Co., Ltd
- Lines: Line 8 Line 12
- Platforms: 4 (2 island platforms)

Construction
- Structure type: Underground

History
- Opened: December 26, 2017 (Line 8); May 1, 2026 (Line 12)

Services
Preceding station	Wuhan Metro	Following station
Xudong towards Jintan Road	Line 8	Yuejiazui towards Military Athletes' Village
Tuanjie Boulevard Outer Circle	Line 12	Qinyuan Middle Road Inner Circle
Location

Wangjiadun Station (Chinese: 汪家墩站) is a station on Line 8 and Line 12 of the Wuhan Metro. It entered revenue service on December 26, 2017. It is located in Hongshan District.

== Station layout ==
G	Entrances and Exits
B1	Concourse	Faregates, Station Agent
B2	Northbound	← Line 8 towards Jintan Road (Xudong)
B2	Island platform, doors will open on the left
B2	Southbound	Line 8 towards Military Athletes' Village (Yuejiazui) →
B3	Outer Circle	← Line 12 Outer Circle (Tuanjie Boulevard)
B3	Island platform, doors will open on the left
B3	Inner Circle	Line 12 Inner Circle (Qinyuan Middle Road) →
