= Zhuyeshan station =

Metro station in Wuhan, China

Zhuyeshan 竹叶山 metro
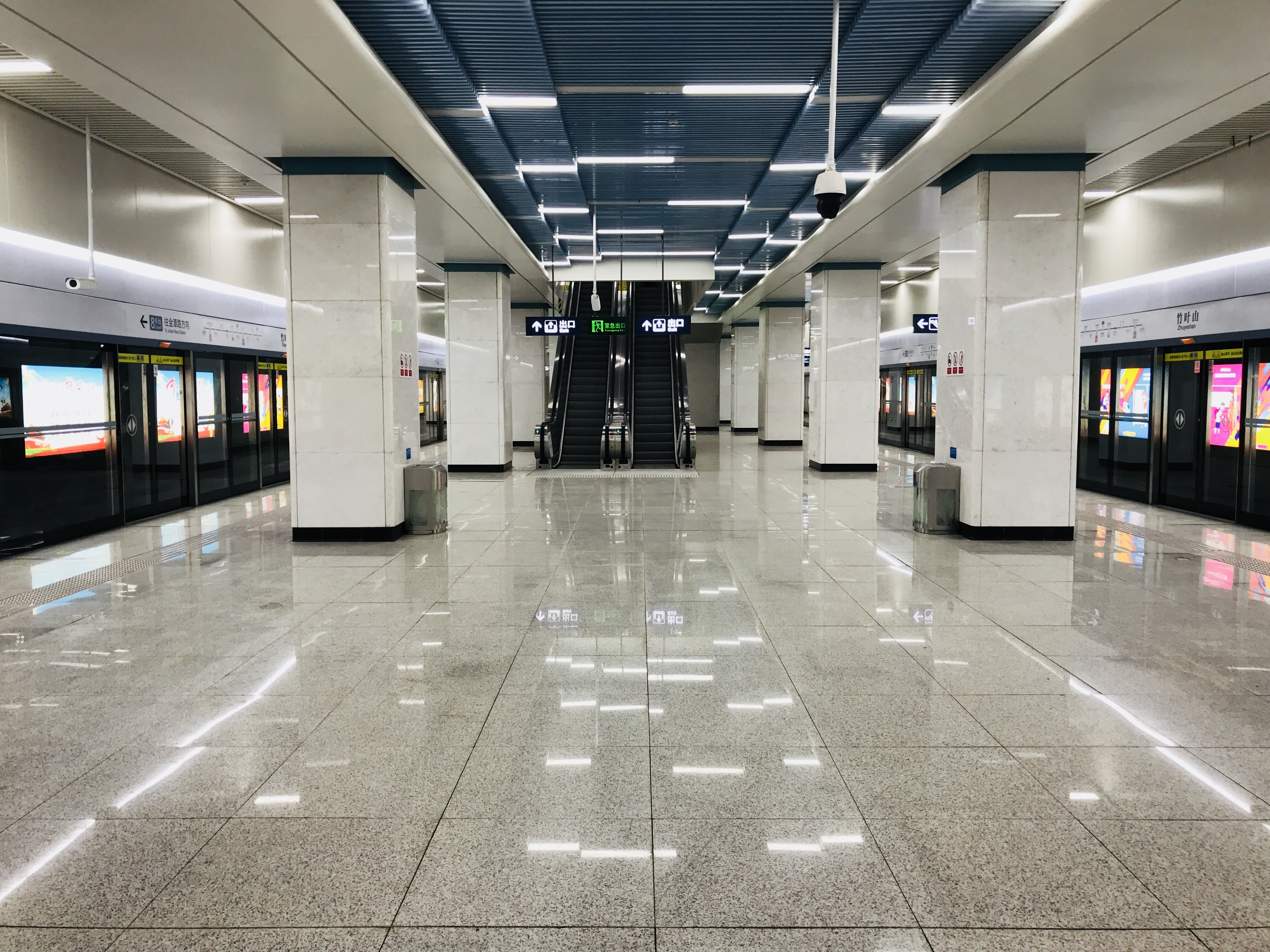

General information
- Location: Jiang'an District, Wuhan, Hubei; China
- Coordinates: 30.627651°N 114.281833°E
- Operated by: Wuhan Metro Co., Ltd
- Line: Line 8
- Platforms: 2 (1 island platform)

Construction
- Structure type: Underground

History
- Opened: December 26, 2017 (Line 8)

Services
Preceding station	Wuhan Metro	Following station
Zhongyi Road towards Jintan Road	Line 8	Zhaojiatiao towards Military Athletes' Village
Location

Zhuyeshan station (Chinese: 竹叶山站; pinyin: Zhúyèshān zhàn) is a station on Line 8 of the Wuhan Metro. It entered revenue service on December 26, 2017. It is located in Jiang'an District.

== Station layout ==
G	Entrances and Exits	Exits A, B
B1	Plaza	Commercial Area
B2	Concourse	Faregates, Station Agent
B3	Northbound	← Line 8 towards Jintan Road (Zhongyi Road)
B3	Island platform, doors will open on the left
B3	Southbound	Line 8 towards Military Athletes' Village (Zhaojiatiao) →

== Gallery ==
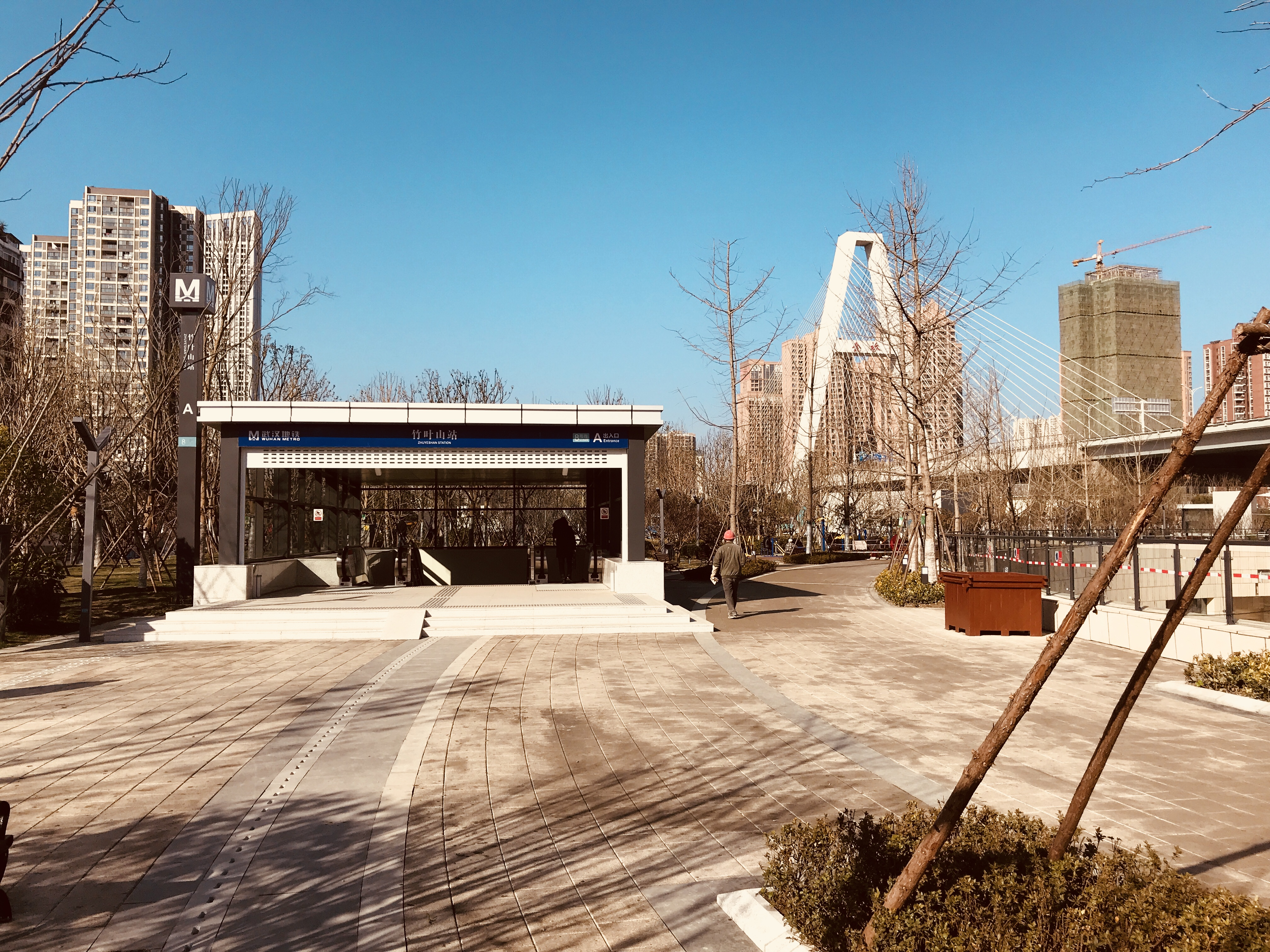
Entrance A

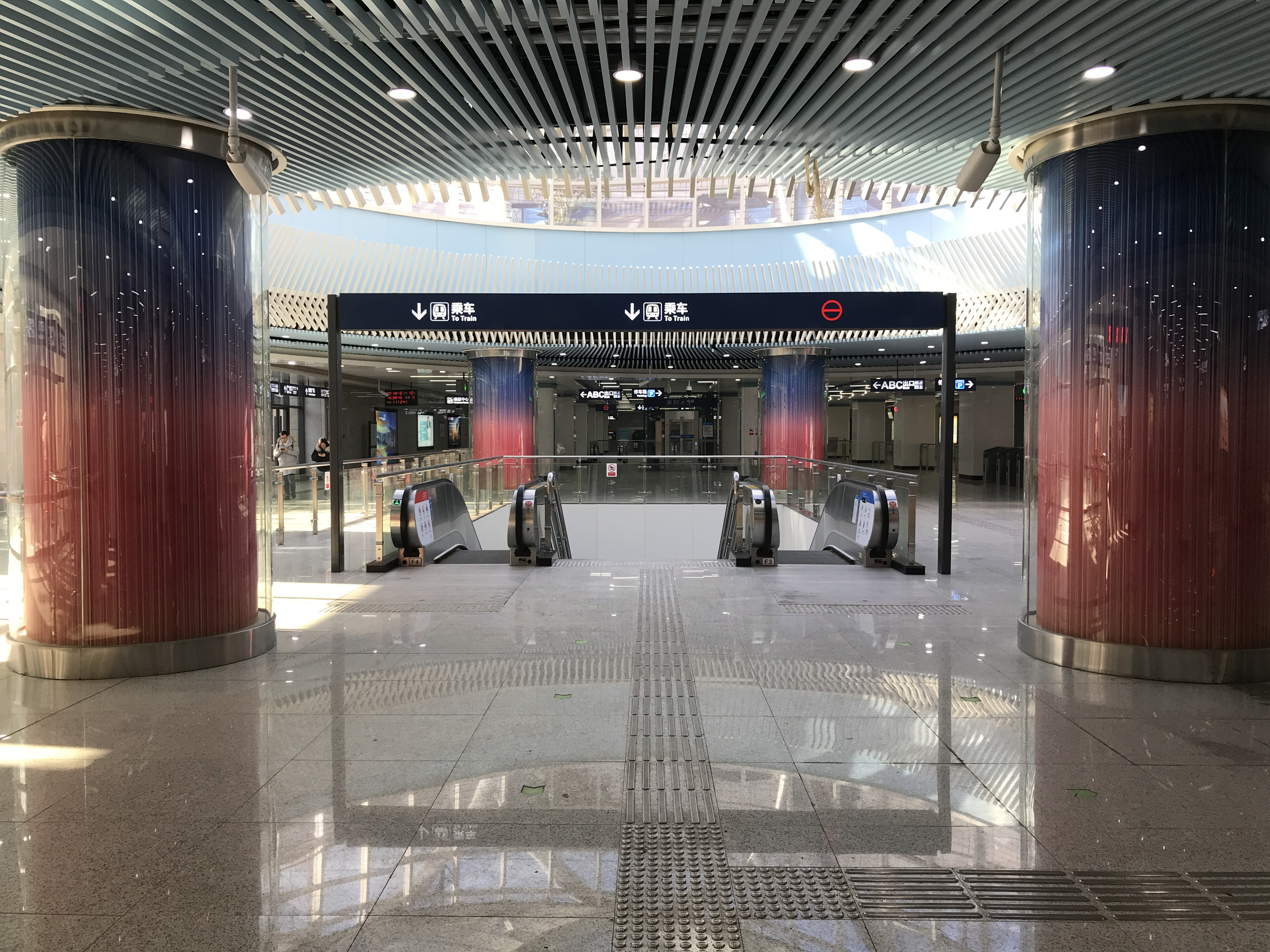
Concourse
