= Liyuan station (Wuhan Metro) =

Metro station in Wuhan, China

Liyuan 梨园 metro
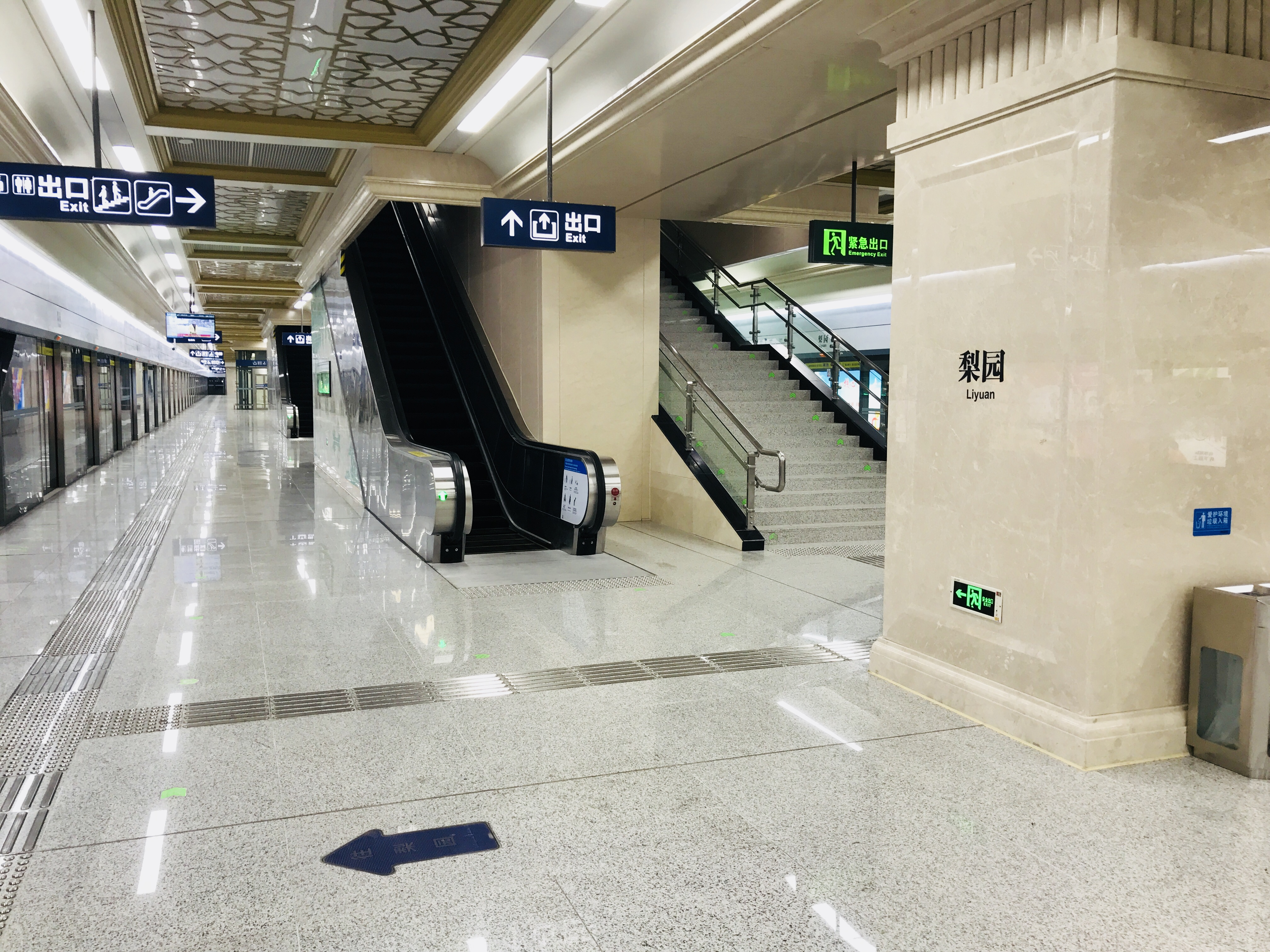

General information
- Location: Wuchang District, Wuhan, Hubei; China
- Coordinates: 30.5771°N 114.3645°E
- Operated by: Wuhan Metro Co., Ltd
- Line: Line 8
- Platforms: 2 (1 island platform)

Construction
- Structure type: Underground

History
- Opened: December 26, 2017 (Line 8)

Services
Preceding station	Wuhan Metro	Following station
Yuejiazui towards Jintan Road	Line 8	Hubei Provincial Museum & Hubei Daily towards Military Athletes' Village
Location

Liyuan Station (Chinese: 梨园站) is a station on Line 8 of the Wuhan Metro. It entered revenue service on December 26, 2017. It is located in Wuchang District.

== Station layout ==
G	Entrances and Exits	Exits A-D
B1	Concourse	Faregates, Station Agent
B2	Northbound	← Line 8 towards Jintan Road (Yuejiazui)
B2	Island platform, doors will open on the left
B2	Southbound	Line 8 towards Military Athletes' Village (Hubei Provincial Museum & Hubei Daily) →
