= Huangpu Road station =

Wuhan Metro station

Huangpu Road 黄浦路 metro
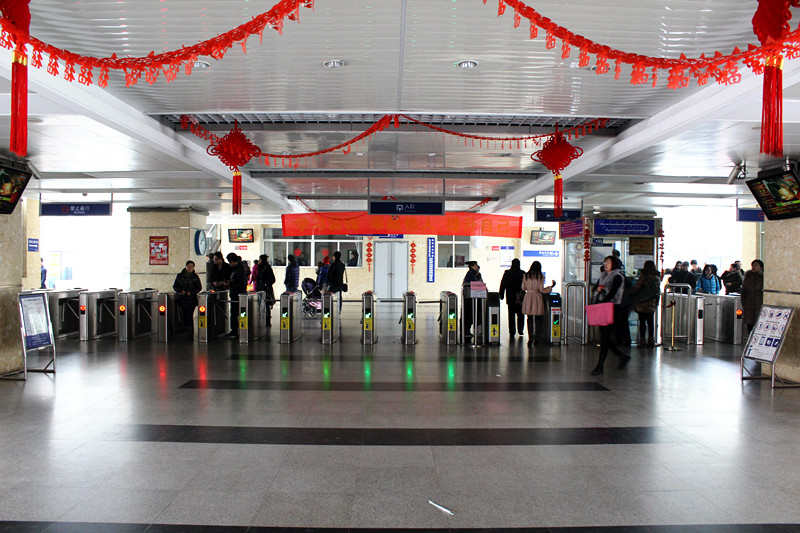
- Station hall and fare gates of Huangpu Road Station.

General information
- Location: Jiang'an District, Wuhan, Hubei; China
- Coordinates: 30°36′28″N 114°18′27″E
- Operated by: Wuhan Metro Co., Ltd
- Lines: Line 1; Line 8
- Platforms: 4 (4 side platforms)

History
- Opened: July 28, 2004; 21 years ago

Services
Preceding station	Wuhan Metro	Following station
Sanyang Road towards Jinghe	Line 1	Toudao Street towards Hankou North
Zhaojiatiao towards Jintan Road	Line 8	Xujiapeng towards Military Athletes' Village
Location

Huangpu Road Station (simplified Chinese: 黄浦路; traditional Chinese: 黃浦路; pinyin: Huángpǔ Lù) serves as an interchange station of Line 1 and Line 8 of the Wuhan Metro . It entered revenue service along with the completion of Line 1, Phase 1 on July 28, 2004. The Line 8 platforms were opened on 26 December 2017. The station situates at the intersection of Jinghan Avenue and Lugouqiao Road. Before Phase 2, Huangpu Road Station was the northernmost terminus on Line 1. A single crossover was installed just south of the station to accommodate for trains entering terminus prior to 2010. The underground platforms for Line 8 has not been built yet.

== Station layout ==
3F	Side platform, doors open on the right
3F	Westbound	← Line 1 towards Jinghe (Sanyang Road)
3F	Eastbound	Line 1 towards Hankou North (Toudao Street) →
3F	Side platform, doors open on the right
2F	Concourse	Faregates, station agent
G	Entrances and exits	Exits A, C-H, J
B1		Transfer passage
B2	Concourse	Faregates, station agent
B3	Side platform, doors open on the right
B3	Northbound	← Line 8 towards Jintan Road (Zhaojiatiao)
B3	Southbound	Line 8 towards Military Athletes' Village (Xujiapeng) →
B3	Side platform, doors open on the right

== Facilities ==
Huangpu Road station for Line 1 is a two-story elevated station erected at the northern end of Jinghan Avenue. The station has two side platforms accommodating a pair of tracks, with a single crossover at the southern end of the station. The station is equipped with attended customer service concierges, automatic ticket vending machines, and accessible ramps.

== Exits ==
There are currently eight exits in service:

- Exit A
- Exit C
- Exit D
- Exit E
- Exit F
- Exit G
- Exit H
- Exit J

== Transfers ==
Bus transfers to Route 30, 60, 212, 402, 520, 526, 548, 583, 588, 606, 707, 721 and 727 are available at Huangpu Road Station.
