= Huangjiahu Ditiexiaozhen station =

Metro station in Wuhan, China

Huangjiahu Ditiexiaozhen 黄家湖地铁小镇 metro

General information
- Location: Jiangxia District, Wuhan, Hubei; China
- Operated by: Wuhan Metro Co., Ltd
- Line: Line 8
- Platforms: 2 (1 island platform)

Construction
- Structure type: Underground

History
- Opened: November 6, 2019 (Line 8)

Services
Preceding station	Wuhan Metro	Following station
Yezhihu towards Jintan Road	Line 8	Military Athletes' Village Terminus
Location

Huangjiahu Ditiexiaozhen Station (Chinese: 黄家湖地铁小镇站) is a station on Line 8 of the Wuhan Metro. It entered revenue service on November 6, 2019. It is located in Jiangxia District.

== Station layout ==
G	Concourse	Faregates, Station Agent
B1	Northbound	← Line 8 towards Jintan Road (Yezhihu)
B1	Island platform, doors will open on the left
B1	Southbound	Line 8 towards Military Athletes' Village (Terminus) →
