= Line 8 (Wuhan Metro) =

Line of Wuhan Metro

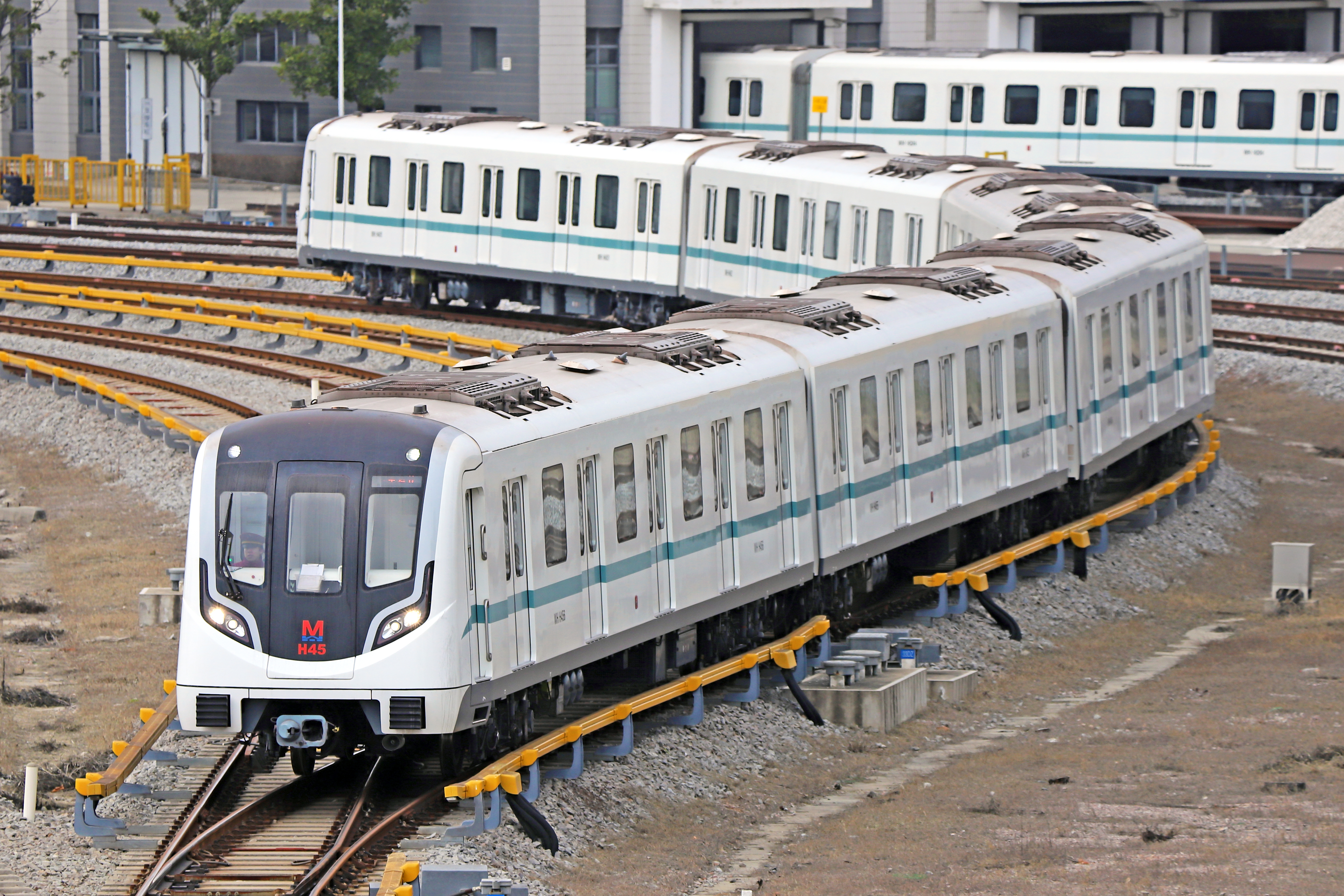

Overview
- Status: Operational
- Owner: Wuhan
- Locale: Wuhan, Hubei
- Termini: Jintan Road; Military Athletes' Village
- Stations: 26

Service
- Type: Rapid transit
- System: Wuhan Metro
- Services: 1
- Operator: Wuhan Metro Group Co., Ltd.
- Rolling stock: CRRC Zhuzhou Locomotive Chinese Type A

History
- Opened: 26 December 2017; 8 years ago

Technical
- Line length: 38.197 km (23.73 mi)
- Num of tracks: 2
- Character: Underground
- Track gauge: 1,435 mm (4 ft 8 1/2 in)

Map of Line 8

Line 8 of the Wuhan Metro was opened on 26 December 2017 as the sixth line in the Wuhan Metro network and the third line (after Line 2 and Line 4) in the system to cross the Yangtze River.

== History ==
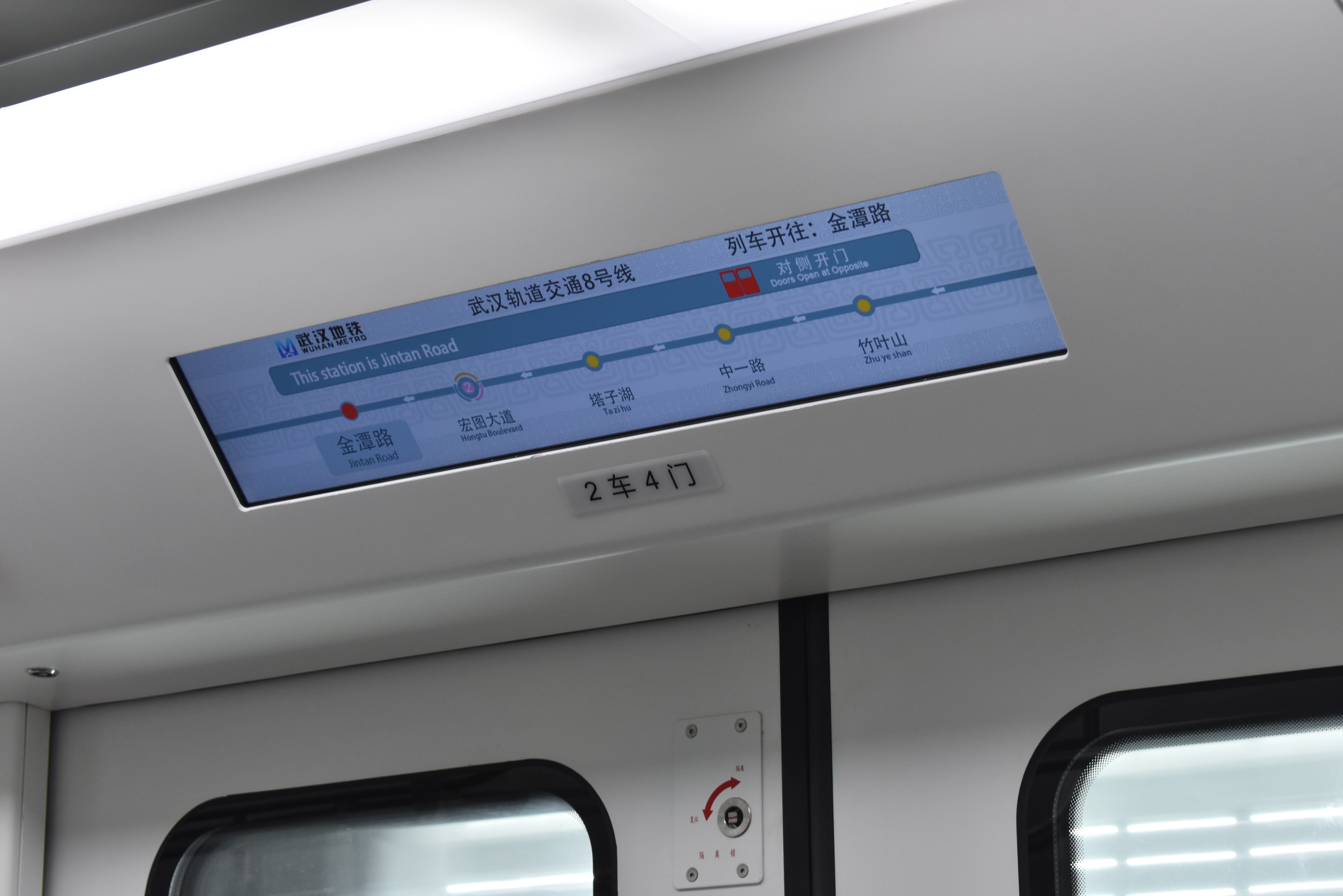
Line 8 train interior LCD

Line 8 is 38.197 kilometers in length and is completed in three phases.

The first phase of Line 8, running from Jintan Road station in Hankou to Liyuan station in Wuchang, was opened on 26 December 2017.

The second phase takes a north-south alignment in Wuchang from Liyuan station to Yezhihu station opened on 2 January 2021.

The third phase, an extension lately added to previous Line 8 plans, runs from Yezhihu station to Military Athletes' Village station, intending to serve the athlete village and audiences of 2019 Military World Games. Therefore, the third phase was opened on 6 November 2019, prior to the scheduled open date of the second phase.

Segment	Commencement	Length	Station(s)	Name
Jintan Road — Liyuan	26 December 2017	16.204 km (10.07 mi)	12	Phase 1
Yezhihu — Military Athletes' Village	6 November 2019	4.84 km (3.01 mi)	3	Phase 3
Liyuan — Yezhihu	2 January 2021	17.6 km (10.94 mi)	11	Phase 2

== Stations ==
Station name		Connections	Distance km		Location
English	Chinese	Connections	Distance km		Location
Jintan Road	金潭路		0.000	0.000	Dongxihu
Hongtu Boulevard	宏图大道	2 3	0.855	0.855	Dongxihu
Tazihu	塔子湖		1.890	2.745	Jiang'an
Zhongyi Road	中一路	12 Yangluo	1.648	4.393	Jiang'an
Zhuyeshan	竹叶山	10	1.574	5.967	Jiang'an
Zhaojiatiao	赵家条	3	1.394	7.361	Jiang'an
Huangpu Road	黄浦路	1	1.419	8.780	Jiang'an
Xujiapeng	徐家棚	5 7	3.494	12.274	Wuchang
Xudong	徐东		0.992	13.266	Wuchang / Hongshan
Wangjiadun	汪家墩	12	0.747	14.013	Wuchang / Hongshan
Yuejiazui	岳家嘴	4	1.318	15.331	Wuchang / Hongshan
Liyuan	梨园		0.873	16.204	Wuchang / Hongshan
Hubei Provincial Museum & Hubei Daily	省博湖北日报				Wuchang
Zhongnan Hospital	中南医院				Wuchang
Shuiguohu	水果湖				Wuchang
Hongshan Road	洪山路				Wuchang
Xiaohongshan	小洪山				Wuchang
Jiedaokou	街道口	2			Hongshan
Mafangshan	马房山	11			Hongshan
Wenzhi Street	文治街				Hongshan
Wenchang Road	文昌路				Hongshan
Hubei Academy of Agricultural Sciences	省农科院				Hongshan
Mahu	马湖				Hongshan
Yezhihu	野芷湖	7			Hongshan
Huangjiahu Ditiexiaozhen	黄家湖地铁小镇				Jiangxia
Military Athletes' Village	军运村				Jiangxia
