= Huiji 2nd Road station =

Rapid transit station in Hubei, China

Huiji 2nd Road 惠济二路 metro

General information
- Location: Jiang'an District, Wuhan, Hubei; China
- Operated by: Wuhan Metro Co., Ltd
- Line: Line 3
- Platforms: 2 (1 island platform)

Construction
- Structure type: Underground

History
- Opened: December 28, 2015 (Line 3)

Services
Preceding station	Wuhan Metro	Following station
Zhaojiatiao towards Hongtu Boulevard	Line 3	Xianggang Road towards Zhuanyang Boulevard
Location

Huiji 2nd Road Station (Chinese: 惠济二路站) is a station of Line 3 of Wuhan Metro. It entered revenue service on December 28, 2015. It is located in Jiang'an District.

== Station layout ==
G	Entrances and Exits	Exits A-H, J
B1	Concourse	Faregates, Station Agent
B2	Northbound	← Line 3 towards Hongtu Boulevard (Zhaojiatiao)
B2	Island platform, doors will open on the left
B2	Southbound	Line 3 towards Zhuanyang Boulevard (Xianggang Road) →
