= Toudao Street station =

Wuhan Metro station

Toudao Street 头道街 metro

General information
- Location: Jiang'an District, Wuhan, Hubei; China
- Coordinates: 30°38′02″N 114°19′24″E
- Operated by: Wuhan Metro Co., Ltd
- Line: Line 1

History
- Opened: July 29, 2010; 15 years ago

Services
Preceding station	Wuhan Metro	Following station
Huangpu Road towards Jinghe	Line 1	Erqi Road towards Hankou North
Location

Toudao Street Station (simplified Chinese: 头道街; traditional Chinese: 頭道街; pinyin: tóu dào jiē) is a station on Line 1 of Wuhan Metro, opened upon completion of Line 1, Phase 2 on July 29, 2010. It is an elevated station located on Jiefang Avenue, close to Second Wuhan Yangtze River Bridge. There are two side platforms and two tracks at Toudao Street Station. A prefabricated bridge was installed south of the station to pass over railroad traffic at the Jiang'an Rail Yard, a freight yard which has since been demolished and redeveloped.

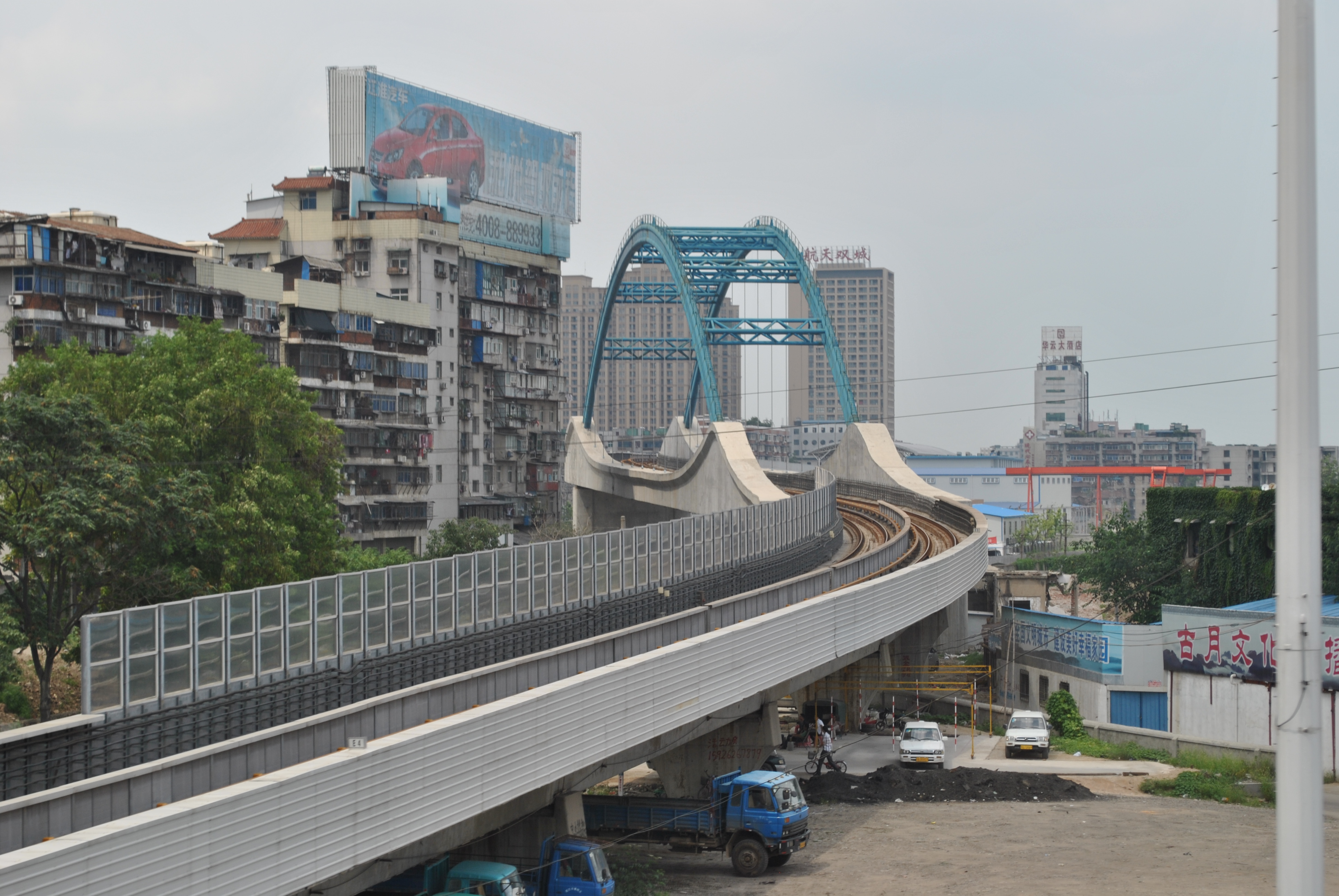
The prefabricated railroad overpass just south of Toudao Street Station.

== Station layout ==
3F	Side platform, doors open on the right
3F	Westbound	← Line 1 towards Jinghe (Huangpu Road)
3F	Eastbound	Line 1 towards Hankou North (Erqi Road) →
3F	Side platform, doors open on the right
2F	Concourse	Faregates, Station Agent
G	Entrances and Exits	Exits A-C

== Facilities ==
Toudao Street Station is a three-story elevated station built entirely along Jiefang Avenue. The station is equipped with attended customer service concierges, automatic ticket vending machines, accessible lifts, and restrooms in the non-fared zone.

== Exits ==
There are currently three exits (A, B and C) in service, all of which are accessible to Jiefang Avenue.

== Transfers ==
Bus transfers to Route 4, 212, 313, 346, 408, 508, 509, 551, 577, 582, 583, 622, 707, 727, 793 and Trolleybus Route 3 are available at Toudao Street Station.
