= Danshuichi station =

Wuhan Metro station

Danshuichi 丹水池 metro

General information
- Location: Jiang'an District, Wuhan, Hubei; China
- Coordinates: 30°38′43″N 114°19′51″E
- Operator: Wuhan Metro Co., Ltd
- Lines: Line 1 Line 12
- Platforms: 4 (2 side platforms, 1 island platform)

Other information
- Station code: 106

History
- Opened: July 29, 2010; 16 years ago (Line 1); October 29, 2026; 2 days ago (Line 12)

Services
Preceding station	Wuhan Metro	Following station
Xuzhouxincun towards Jinghe	Line 1	Xinrong towards Hankou North
Baibuting Outer Circle	Line 12	Science Park Inner Circle
Location

Danshuichi (Chinese: 丹水池) is a station on Line 1 and Line 12 of Wuhan Metro. The Line 1 station opened on July 29, 2010 and the Line 12 station opened on October 29, 2026. The Line 1 station is an elevated station at the intersection of Jiefang Avenue and Handi Road. The name "Danshuichi" is derived from the dialectical pronunciation of "Duanshuichi" (端水吃, literally "Grab water to drink"). There are two side platforms and two tracks at Danshuichi.

== Station layout ==
3F	Side platform, doors open on the right
3F	Westbound	← Line 1 towards Jinghe (Xuzhouxincun)
3F	Eastbound	Line 1 towards Hankou North (Xinrong) →
3F	Side platform, doors open on the right
2F	Line 1 Concourse	Faregates, Station Agent
G	Entrances and Exits	Exits A-D
B1	Line 12 Concourse	Faregates, Station Agent
B2	Outer Circle	← Line 12 Outer Circle (Baibuting)
B2	Island platform, doors will open on the left
B2	Inner Circle	Line 12 Inner Circle (Science Park) →

== Facilities ==
Danshuichi Station is a three-story elevated station built entirely along Jiefang Avenue. The station is equipped with attended customer service concierges, automatic ticket vending machines, accessible lifts, and restrooms in the fared zone.

== Exits ==
There are currently four exits in service.

- Exit A: Jiefang Avenue
- Exit B: Jiefang Avenue. Accessible to Danshuichi Elementary School.
- Exit C: Jiefang Avenue. Accessible to Baibuting Community.
- Exit D: Jiefang Avenue

== Transfers ==
Bus transfers to Route 3, 4, 211, 212, 232, 234, 301, 509, 577, 615, 717, 727, 809 are available at Danshuichi Station.
