= Luojiagang station =

Metro station in Wuhan, China

Luojiagang 罗家港 metro
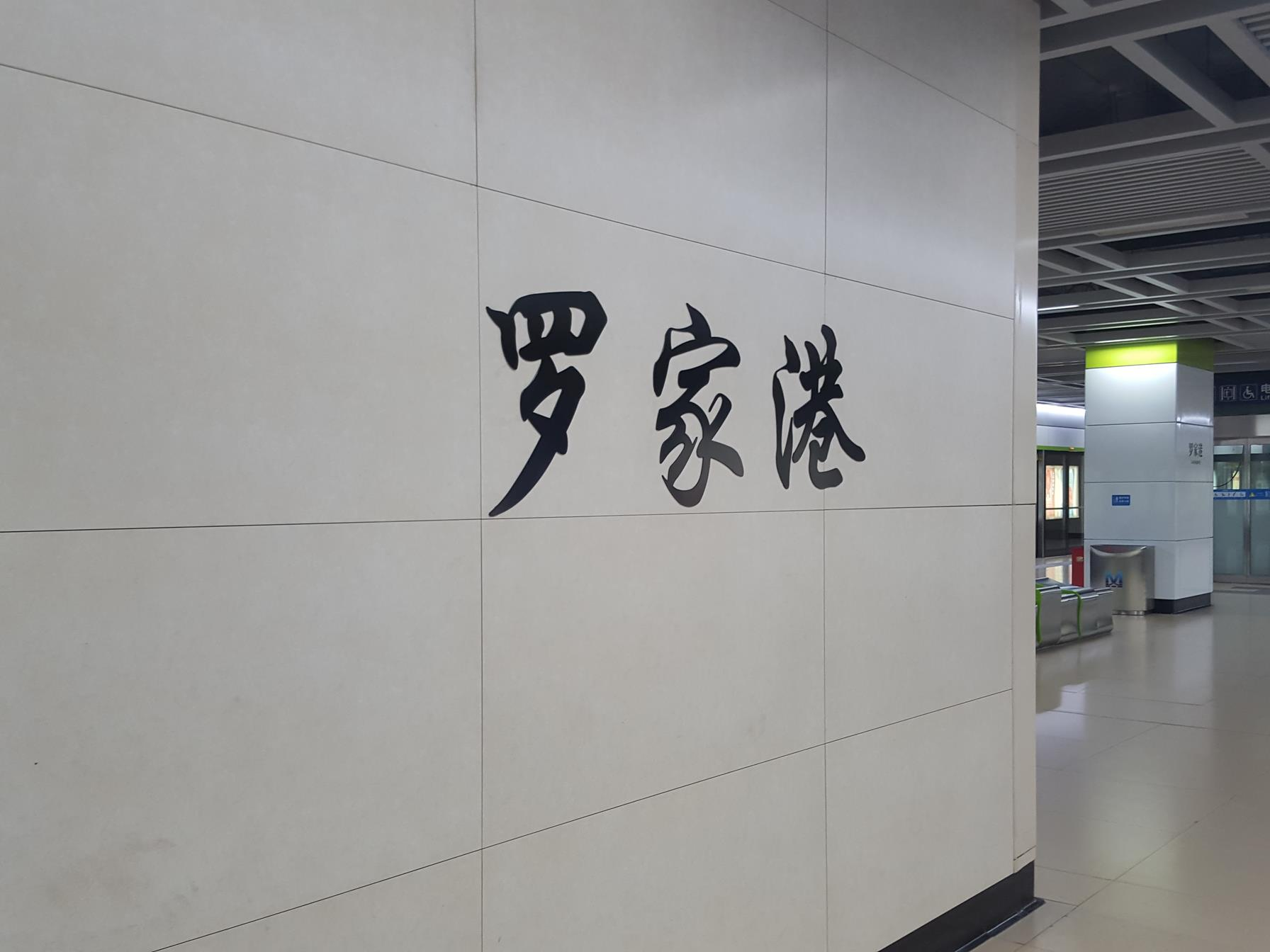

General information
- Location: Hongshan District, Wuhan, Hubei; China
- Operated by: Wuhan Metro Co., Ltd
- Line: Line 4
- Platforms: 2 (1 island platform)

Construction
- Structure type: Underground

History
- Opened: December 28, 2013 (Line 4)

Services
| Preceding station | Wuhan Metro | Following station |
|---|---|---|
| Tieji Road towards Bailin | Line 4 | Yuanlin Road towards Wuhan Railway Station |
Location

Luojiagang Station (Chinese: 罗家港站) is a station of Line 4 of Wuhan Metro. It entered revenue service on December 28, 2013. It is located in Hongshan District.

== Station layout ==
| G | Entrances and Exits | Exits A, B, D |
| B1 | Concourse | Faregates, Station Agent |
| B2 | Westbound | ← Line 4 towards Bailin (Tieji Road) |
| B2 | Island platform, doors will open on the left |
| B2 | Eastbound | Line 4 towards Wuhan Railway Station (Yuanlin Road) → |

== Gallery ==
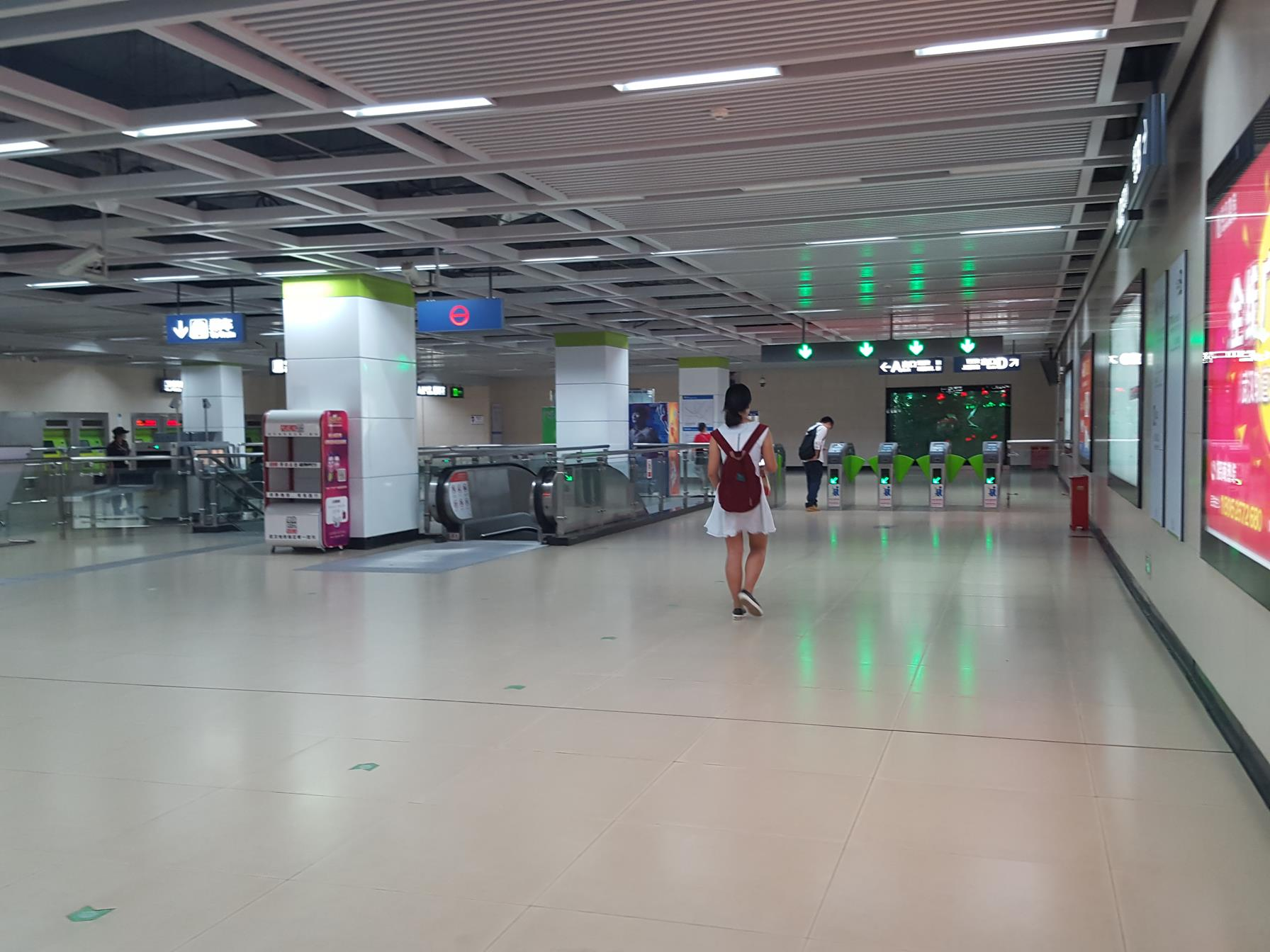
Concourse

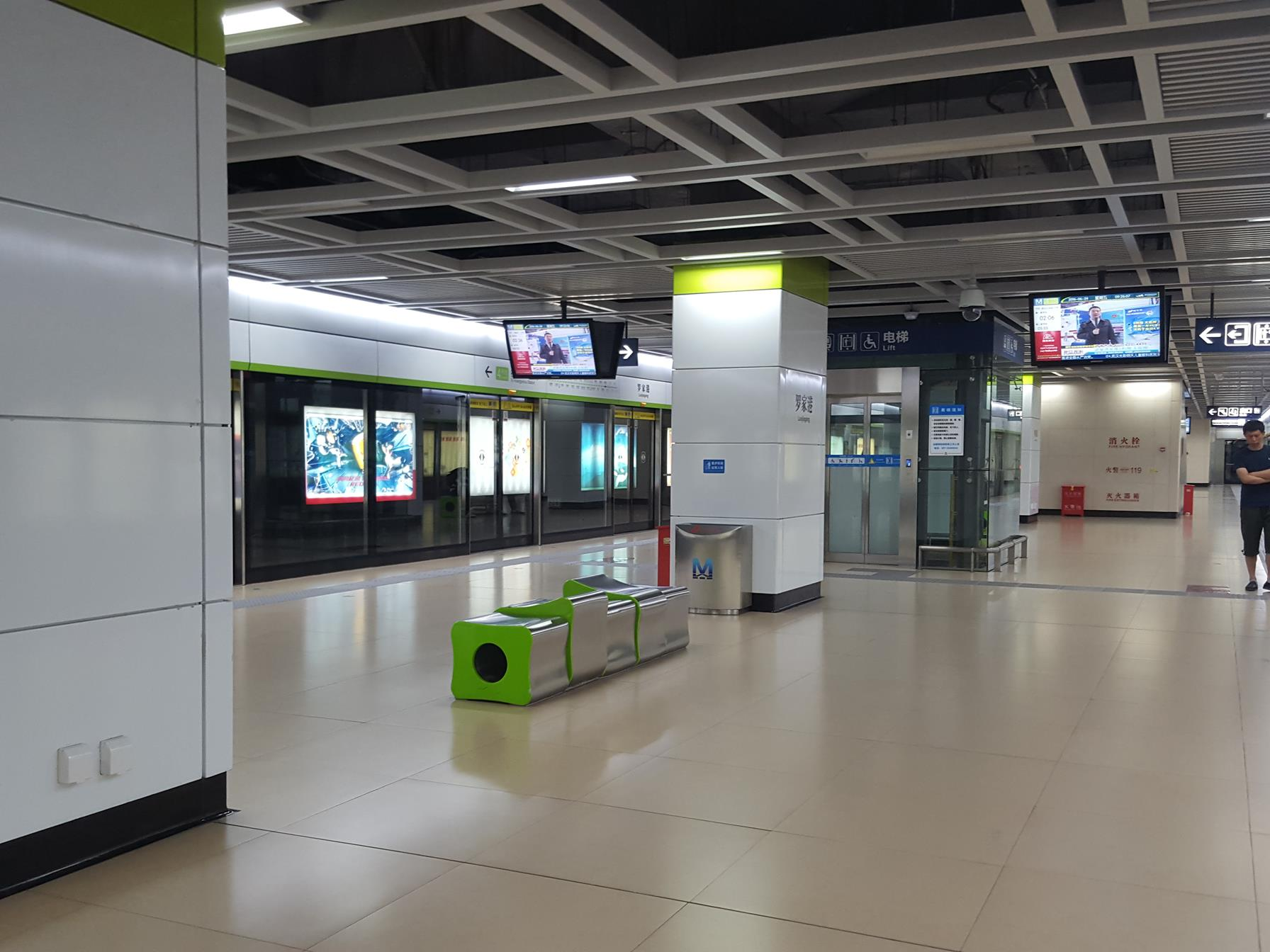
Platform
