= Xuzhouxincun station =

Wuhan Metro station

Xuzhouxincun 徐州新村

General information
- Location: Jiang'an District, Wuhan, Hubei; China
- Coordinates: 30°37′50″N 114°19′22″E
- Operated by: Wuhan Metro Co., Ltd
- Line: Line 1
- Platforms: 2 (2 side platforms)

Other information
- Station code: 107

History
- Opened: July 29, 2010; 15 years ago

Services
Preceding station	Wuhan Metro	Following station
Erqi Road towards Jinghe	Line 1	Danshuichi towards Hankou North
Location

Xuzhouxincun (Chinese: 徐州新村) is a station on Line 1 of Wuhan Metro, opened along with the completion of Line 1, Phase 2 on July 29, 2010. It is an elevated station situated on Jiefang Avenue, with proximity to Erqi Yangtze River Bridge, Wuhan Erqi Memorial Hall, and downtown bus transfers. The station has two side platforms serving trains from each direction.

== Station layout ==
3F	Side platform, doors open on the right
3F	Westbound	← Line 1 towards Jinghe (Erqi Road)
3F	Eastbound	Line 1 towards Hankou North (Danshuichi) →
3F	Side platform, doors open on the right
2F	Concourse	Faregates, Station Agent
G	Entrances and Exits	Exits A, B

== Facilities ==
Xuzhouxincun Station is a three-story elevated station built entirely along Jiefang Avenue. The station is equipped with attended customer service concierges, automatic ticket vending machines, accessible lifts, and restrooms in fared zone.

== Exits ==
There are currently two exits in service:

- Exit A: Jiefang Avenue, accessible to Zhongbai Cangchu Erqi Shopping Center
- Exit B: Jiefang Avenue, accessible to Xincunjie Community Clinic and Wuhan Erqi Memorial Hall.

== Transfers ==
Bus transfers to Route 3, 4, 211, 212, 232, 234, 509, 577, 615, 727, 809, Trolleybus Route 3 and 4 are available at Xuzhouxincun Station.
