= Erqi Road station =

Wuhan Metro station

Erqi Road 二七路
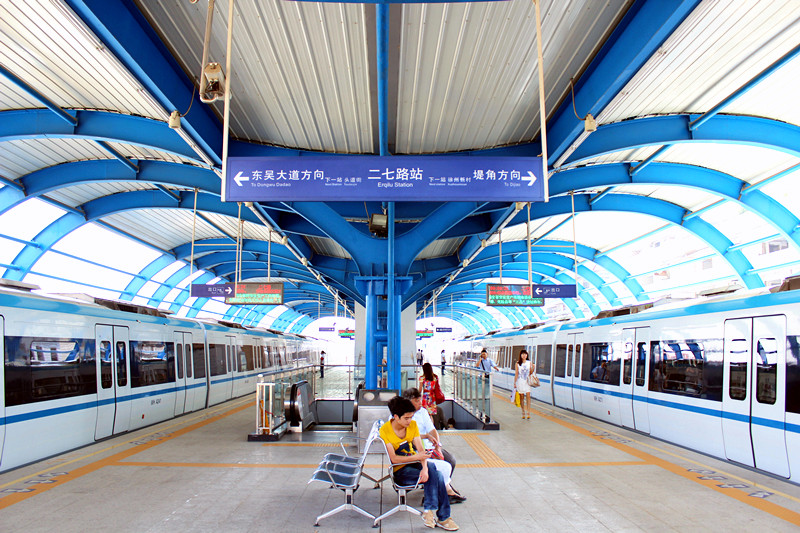
- Erqi Road Station viewed from the island platform.

General information
- Location: Jiang'an District, Wuhan, Hubei; China
- Coordinates: 30°37′30″N 114°19′09″E
- Operated by: Wuhan Metro Co., Ltd
- Line: Line 1
- Platforms: 2 (1 island platform)

Other information
- Station code: 108

History
- Opened: July 29, 2010; 15 years ago

Services
Preceding station	Wuhan Metro	Following station
Toudao Street towards Jinghe	Line 1	Xuzhouxincun towards Hankou North
Location

Erqi Road (Chinese: 二七路; pinyin: Èrqī Lù) is a station on Line 1 of Wuhan Metro, opened upon the completion of Line 1 (Phase 2) on July 29, 2010. It is an elevated station situated at the intersection of Jiefang Avenue and Erqi Road. The station has one island platform and two siding tracks to the north of the station, connected by a pair of crossover tracks, accommodating trains entering and exiting services during peak hours.

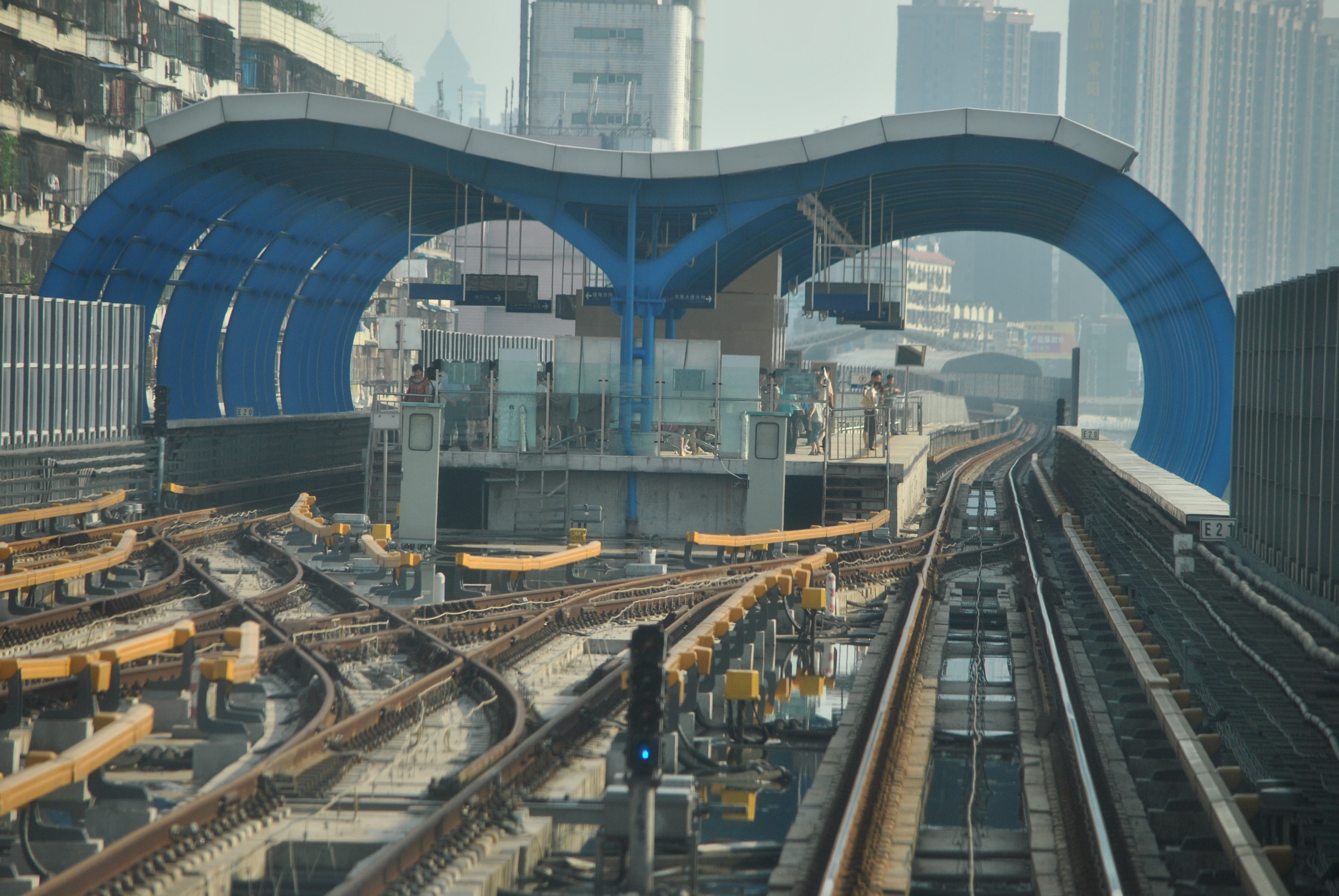
The pair of crossover tracks viewed from the southbound track.

Erqi Road Station is accessible from the site of Jinghan Workers Union Headquarters, Hankou East Shopping Park, and Jiang'an District Railroad Cultural Palace.

== Station layout ==
Erqi Road Station is a three-story elevated station built entirely along Jiefang Avenue. It has a single island platform.

3F	Westbound	← Line 1 towards Jinghe (Toudao Street)
3F	Island platform, doors open on the left
3F	Eastbound	Line 1 towards Hankoubei (Xushouxincun) →
2F	Concourse	Faregates, Station Agent
G	Entrances and Exits	Exits A-C

== Exits ==
There are currently three exits in service, A; B; and C. They are all located on Jiefang Avenue.

== Transfers ==
Bus transfers to routes 3, 4, 211, 229, 212, 301, 508, 509, 555, 577, 583, 622, 707, 717, 721, 727 and 809 are available at Erqi Road Station.
