= Jintan Road station =

Metro station in Wuhan, China

Jintan Road 金潭路 metro
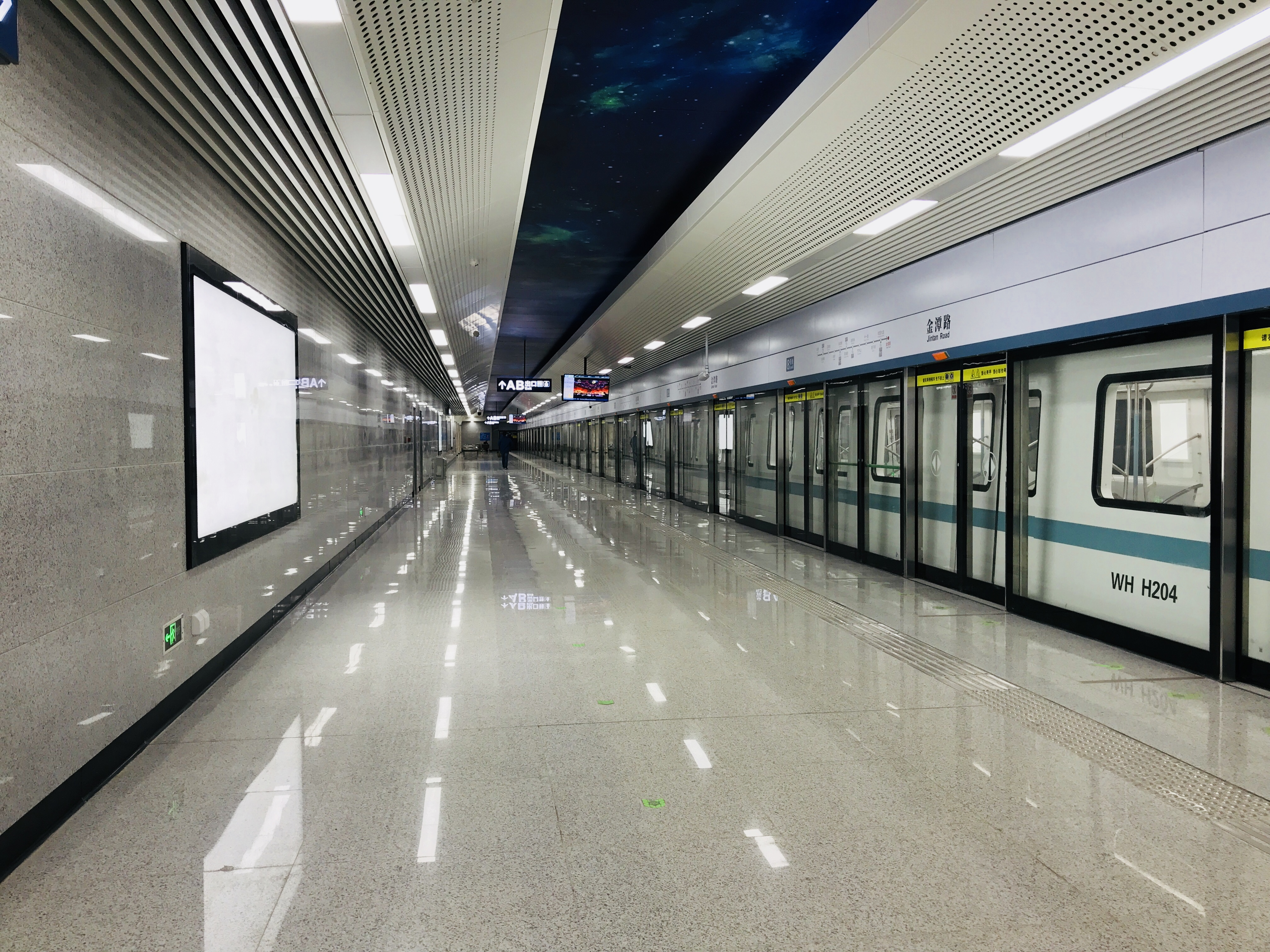

General information
- Location: Dongxihu District, Wuhan, Hubei; China
- Coordinates: 30.6781°N 114.2779°E
- Operated by: Wuhan Metro Co., Ltd
- Line: Line 8
- Platforms: 3 (1 side platform, 1 island platform)

Construction
- Structure type: Underground

History
- Opened: December 26, 2017 (Line 8)

Services
Preceding station	Wuhan Metro	Following station
Terminus	Line 8	Hongtu Boulevard towards Military Athletes' Village
Location

Jintan Road Station (Chinese: 金潭路站) is a station on Line 8 of the Wuhan Metro. It entered revenue service on December 26, 2017. It is located in Dongxihu District and it is the northern terminus of Line 8.

== Station layout ==
G	Entrances and Exits
B1	Concourse	Faregates, Station Agent
B2	Side platform, doors will open on the right
B2	Northbound	← Line 8 termination platform
B2	Southbound	Line 8 towards Military Athletes' Village (Hongtu Boulevard) →
B2	Island platform, doors will open on the left/right
B2	Southbound	Line 8 towards Military Athletes' Village (Hongtu Boulevard) →
