= Jinghe =

Jinghe may refer to:

== Places in China ==
- Jing River (泾河; Jīnghé), a river in Gansu and Shaanxi provinces
- Jinghe County, Börtala Mongol Autonomous Prefecture, Xinjiang
  - Jinghe Town, Xinjiang, in Jinghe County
- Jinghe, Hebei, in Hejian, Hebei
- Jinghe, Hunan, in Xiangyin County, Hunan
- Jinghe, Jiangsu, in Baoying County, Jiangsu
- Jinghe Subdistrict, Hunchun, in Hunchun, Jilin
- Jinghe Subdistrict, Tengzhou, in Yicheng District, Shandong (see List of township-level divisions of Shandong)
- Jinghe Subdistrict, Wuhan, in Dongxihu District, Hubei
  - Jinghe station, on the Wuhan Metro

== People ==
- Pan Jinghe, Chinese Indonesian landlord and social activist
- Paul Liu Jinghe, Chinese bishop
