= Xie Linka =

2019–20 coronavirus pandemic whistleblower

Xie Linka (born 1981, Chinese: 谢琳卡; pinyin: Xiè Línkǎ) is a Chinese physician who gave early warning about the spread of COVID-19 in Wuhan, China. She became known for being a whistleblower, a title given to others in China who had warned the public, such as Liu Wen, and Dr. Li Wenliang, who was infected and later died from the virus.

== Education ==
Xie Linka graduated with a PhD from the Tongji Medical College of Huazhong University of Science and Technology, and is the attending physician at the Cancer Center at Wuhan Union Hospital.

Messages by Xie Linka in the WeChat Group of “肿瘤中心” at 20:43 on December 30, 2019

Dear teachers, my coworker from the infectious ward has shared a piece of information from the ward with us:
In the coming days, please avoid Huanan Seafood Wholesale Market, several people who went there are currently suffering from a pneumonia of unknown origin (similar to SARS). Today, our hospital has already received several patients with pneumonia who had visited the Huanan Seafood Wholesale Market.

- Please everyone, be cautious, wear surgical masks or respirators.

— Screenshot from the Caixin report

== Whistleblowing incident ==
On December 30, 2019, Xie Linka posted a message in the WeChat group for her workplace, the Cancer Center at Wuhan Union Hospital.

She stated, "Don't visit Huanan Seafood Wholesale Market in the near future. Many people there have contracted an inexplicable pneumonia (similar to SARS). Our hospital has admitted numerous pneumonia patients from the Huanan Seafood Wholesale Market today. Everyone, please make sure to wear masks and keep your room ventilated," and cited her source as "news posted in our alumni group by a junior from my hospital."

== Police call ==
Around January 3, 2020, Xie received a phone call from the Wuhan Police, instructing her not to spread "false information", although she noted they were "very polite" in their tone.

== Interview comment ==
Xie later stated in an interview that her "early warning" to the public was part of a doctor's duty.

== See also ==
- COVID-19 pandemic
- COVID-19 pandemic in mainland China
- Li Wenliang
- Liu Wen
- Jiang Yanyong
