= Jinyintan =

Jinyintan may refer to:

- Jinyintan Hospital, hospital in Wuhan, Hubei, China
- Jinyintan station, metro station in Wuhan, Hubei, China
