= Xin Zhou (MRI scientist) =

Chinese physicist

- Education: Wuhan Institute of Physics and Mathematics, Chinese Academy of Sciences、 Harvard University

Xin Zhou (Chinese: 周欣) is a Chinese scientist specializing in magnetic resonance imaging. He holds the position of Professor and currently serves as the President of the Innovation Academy for Precision Measurement Science and Technology (APM) at the Chinese Academy of Sciences since July 2022. APM comprises two state key laboratories: the State Key Laboratory of Magnetic Resonance and Atomic and Molecular Physics, and the State Key Laboratory of Geodesy and Earth's Dynamics. Additionally, it hosts several national platforms, including the National Center for Magnetic Resonance in Wuhan.

== Work Experience ==
Zhou obtained his Ph.D. degree in magnetic resonance imaging from Wuhan Institute of Physics and Mathematics, Chinese Academy of Sciences (WIPM, CAS) in 2004. He then finished his post-doctoral training in department of Radiology at Brigham and Women's Hospital, Harvard Medical School between 2005-2007. He joined the University of California Berkeley & Lawrence Berkeley National Laboratory as a research fellow between 2007-2009.From October 2009 to July 2019, he served as a Professor at the Wuhan Institute of Physics and Mathematics, Chinese Academy of Sciences.From July 2019 to July 2022, he held the position of Researcher, Ph.D. Supervisor, and Deputy Director at the Innovation Academy for Precision Measurement Science and Technology, Chinese Academy of Sciences. Since July 2022, he had been serving as the Director, Researcher, and Ph.D. Supervisor at the Innovation Academy for Precision Measurement Science and Technology, Chinese Academy of Sciences.

== Career ==
Zhou has experience in magnetic resonance imaging (MRI) and spectroscopy, focusing on ultrasensitive MRI instruments, techniques, and biosensors for medical imaging. He developed the clinically approved Human Lung Gas MRI Instrument, which was applied in the Jinyintan Hospital (Wuhan, China) and the Tongji Hospital for evaluating pulmonary injuries caused by viruses in discharged patients. He also developed multi-nuclei MRI technologies and high sensitivity MRI contrast agents, which are expected to assist with research on lung and brain diseases.

== Honors ==
Zhou was awarded Top Ten National Science and Technology Innovative Person(2018), the first XPLORER PRIZE(2019), the National Innovation Award(2020) and Top Ten Annual Innovative Person, CAS(2021)
