= Liu Wen =

Liu Wen may refer to:

- Liu Wen (model) (born 1988), Chinese model
- Liu Wen (doctor), one of the whistleblowers of the 2019-20 coronavirus outbreak
