= Dongwu Boulevard station =

Wuhan Metro station

Dongwu Boulevard 东吴大道 metro
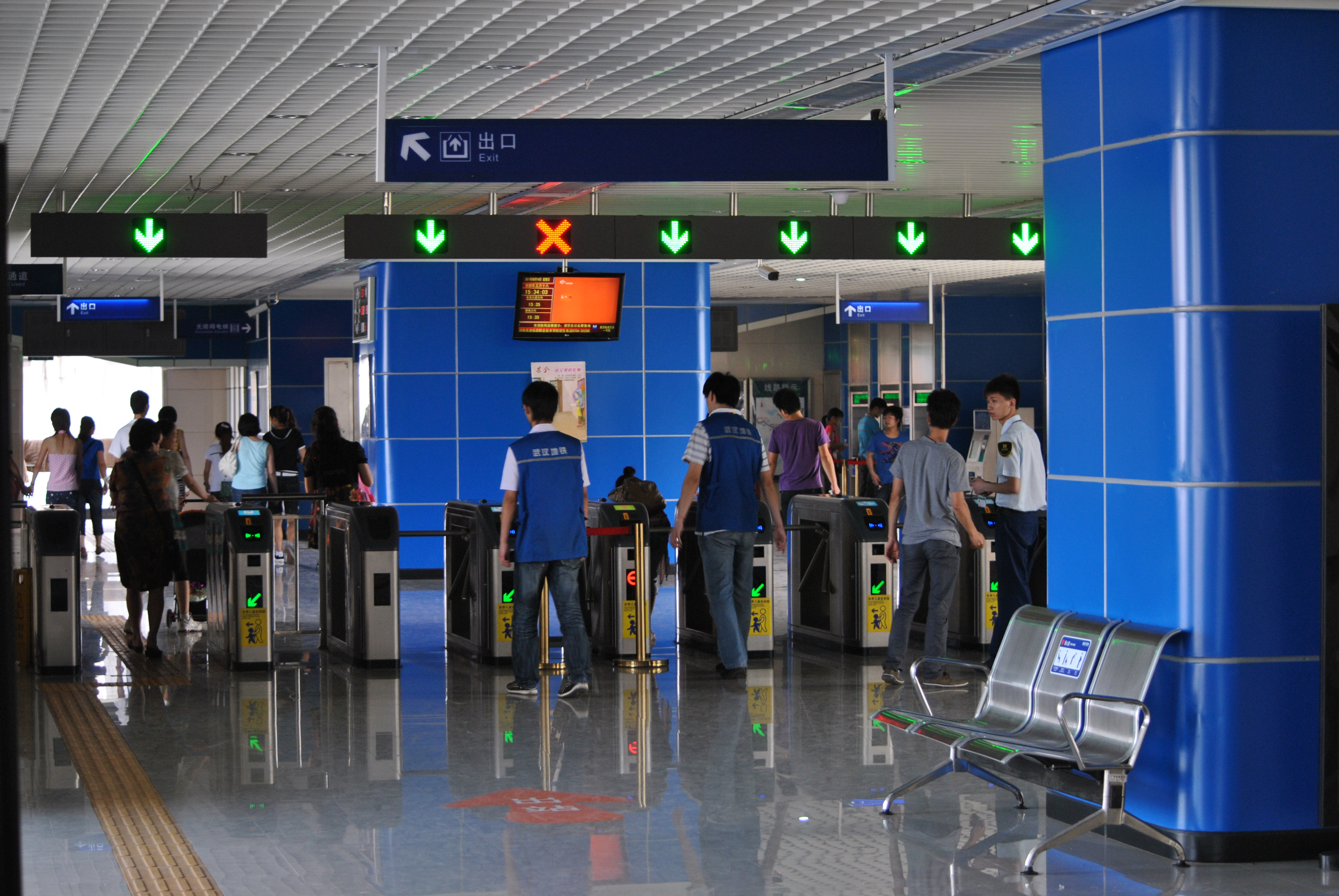

General information
- Location: Dongxihu District, Wuhan, Hubei; China
- Coordinates: 30°35′04″N 114°13′13″E
- Operated by: Wuhan Metro Co., Ltd
- Line: Line 1
- Platforms: 2 (2 side platforms)

Construction
- Structure type: Elevated

History
- Opened: July 29, 2010; 15 years ago (Line 1)

Services
Preceding station	Wuhan Metro	Following station
Matoutan Park towards Jinghe	Line 1	Wuhuan Boulevard towards Hankou North
Location

Dongwu Boulevard Station (Chinese: 东吴大道站) is a station on Line 1 of the Wuhan Metro. It was previously the western terminus of Line 1 until December 26, 2017. It entered revenue service on July 29, 2010. It is located in Dongxihu District.

== Station layout ==
3F	Side platform, doors open on the right
3F	Westbound	← Line 1 towards Jinghe (Matoutan Park)
3F	Eastbound	Line 1 towards Hankou North (Wuhuan Boulevard) →
3F	Side platform, doors open on the right
2F	Concourse	Faregates, Station Agent
G	Entrances and Exits

== Transfers ==
Bus transfers to Route 746, 528, H81 and HM1 are available at Dongwu Boulevard Station.
