= Wuhan Jinyintan Hospital =

Geography
- Location: Jiangjunlu Subdistrict, Dongxihu District, Wuhan, Hubei, China
- Coordinates: 30°40′9″N 114°16′53″E

History
- Founded: 18 July 2008; 17 years ago

Links
- Website: whyljz.com.cn (archived)

The Wuhan Jinyintan Hospital (Chinese: 武汉市金银潭医院) is a municipal public hospital located on Jinyintan Avenue in the Jiangjunlu Subdistrict, in the Dongxihu District of Wuhan, Hubei, China, and a unit directly under the Wuhan Municipal Health and Health Committee. Jinyintan Hospital specialises in infectious diseases. Jinyintan Hospital is one of the designated hospitals for emergency medical treatment in Hubei, including Wuhan. The hospital's president is Dr. Zhang Dingyu, a respiratory specialist. Its vice-director is Dr. Huang Chaolin.

== COVID-19 pandemic ==
At the start of the COVID-19 pandemic in China, many of those infected were treated here, including some of the first COVID-19 patients. The hospital saw 170 people with pneumonia symptoms by January 23, 2020, and nearly 500 COVID-19 patients at the peak of the pandemic in Wuhan. In January 2020, a group of researchers at the hospital published a paper in which they said they were concerned that the virus had "acquired the ability for efficient human transmission".

== See also ==
- Leishenshan Hospital
- Central Hospital of Wuhan
- Huoshenshan Hospital
