= Liu Wen (doctor) =

Whistleblower of the COVID-19 pandemic

Liu Wen (Chinese: 刘文) is a doctor working in the neurology department of the Wuhan Red Cross Hospital, who was one of the "whistleblowers" on the COVID-19 pandemic.

== Life ==
Liu studied clinical medicine in the Medical Department of Wuhan University and works in Wuhan Red Cross Hospital. At the beginning of the COVID-19 pandemic, at 19:39 pm on 30 December 2019, he posted a message in his work WeChat group "协和红会神内 (Union Red Cross Neuro)", saying "Just now a case of infectious coronavirus pneumonia was confirmed in the Houhu District of the Second Hospital. Maybe the places around Huanan will be quarantined." "SARS has been basically confirmed. To our nursing colleagues: Don't go wandering around down there."

On 31 December, relevant departments of the hospital interviewed him, asked him for his source, and told him "don't spread fabricated rumours". Liu wrote down the incident accompanied by two police officers. In news interviews afterwards, he said that at that time he heard that it was pneumonia by coronavirus infection, that he had the impression that it was SARS and MERS, and that he reminded medical staff to pay more attention to safety as he considered that there might be person-to-person transmission.

On 7 February, the media outlet Caixin visited Liu. Liu said that he was called by the police to the police station around 2 January. The police asked for the source of the news and what happened, listed written transcripts, and then asked Liu to give his fingerprints, but he received no written reprimanding like Li Wenliang did. Liu said the trip to the police station stressed him out, but he did not regret it. Caixin said that "whistleblower" Liu Wen, like the other two doctors who were interviewed by the public security police (Li Wenliang and Xie Linka), did not know whether he was one of the eight people put on the public notice.

== See also ==
- COVID-19 pandemic – Pandemic caused by SARS-CoV-2
- COVID-19 pandemic in mainland China
- Li Wenliang – Chinese ophthalmologist (1985–2020)
- Xie Linka – 2019–20 coronavirus pandemic whistleblower
- Jiang Yanyong – Chinese physician and whistleblower of SARS epidemic in China (1931–2023)
