= Wujiashan Subdistrict =

Wujiashan Subdistrict 吴家山街道
- Subdistrict
- Location of Wujiashan Subdistrict in Hubei
- Coordinates: 30°37′23″N 114°8′16″E
- Country: China
- Province: Hubei
- Prefecture-level city: Wuhan
- District: Dongxihu District
- Time zone: UTC+8 (China Standard)

Wujiashan Subdistrict (simplified Chinese: 吴家山街道; traditional Chinese: 吳家山街道; pinyin: Wújiāshān Jiēdào) is a subdistrict in Dongxihu District, Wuhan, Hubei, China.
