= Chen Bang =

Chinese billionaire businessman

- Born: 1965 (age 60–61)

Chen Bang (born 1965) is a Chinese billionaire and businessman, the chair of the Aier Eye Hospital, which is the largest ophthalmology chain in China.

Chen Bang was born in a military family in Changsha. At the age of 17, he even tried to voluntarily join the army but was not admitted because of his color blindness. Later Chen Bang started working at the state-owned enterprise in Changsha but soon decided to start his own business as an owner of a coconut juice agency. At the age of 27, he became a billionaire but lost his fortune because of the Chinese property bubble. In 1995, he started his new business as a founder of folk culture theme parks in Taiwan; however, this business also failed. In 1997, he started setting up professional ophthalmology hospitals and in 2001, he founded the Aier Private Eye Hospital. In 2017, Chen Bang's company purchased the largest eye clinic group in Europe, Clinica Baviera SA. As of 2020, Aier Eye Hospital Group owned around 500 specialized eye hospitals in China, 86 in Europe, 12 in Southeast Asia, and 1 in the US.

Chen Bang made the 2022 Forbes Billionaires List with an estimated wealth of $12.7 billion and occupied the 146th position.
