= Changqingcheng station =

Metro station in Wuhan, China

Changqingcheng 常青城 metro
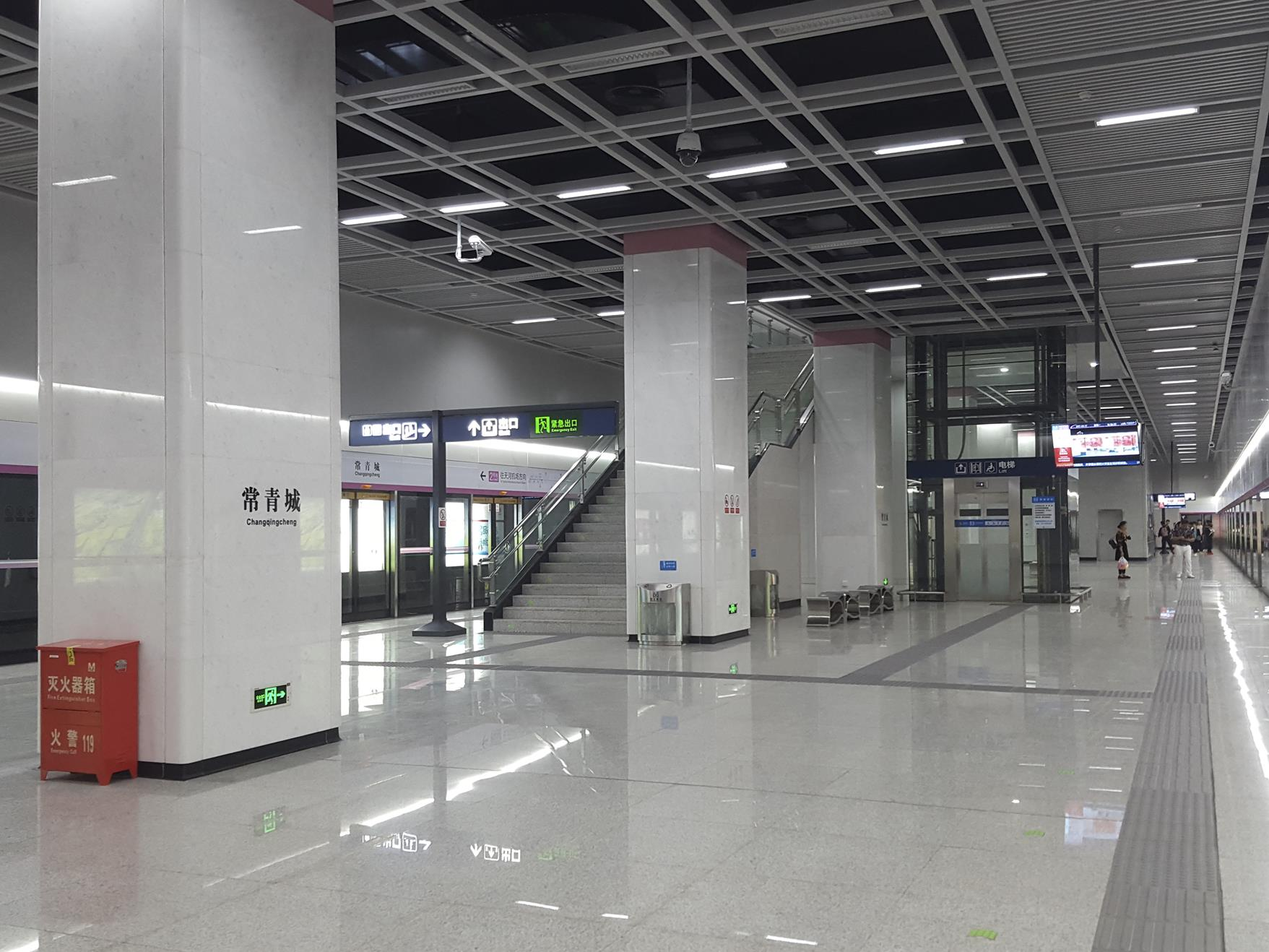

General information
- Location: Dongxihu District, Wuhan, Hubei; China
- Coordinates: 30.66128°N 114.24974°E
- Operated by: Wuhan Metro Co., Ltd
- Line: Line 2
- Platforms: 2 (1 island platform)

Construction
- Structure type: Underground

History
- Opened: December 28, 2016 (Line 2)

Services
Preceding station	Wuhan Metro	Following station
Hongtu Boulevard towards Tianhe International Airport	Line 2	Jinyintan towards Fozuling
Location

Changqingcheng Station (Chinese: 常青城站) is a station on Line 2 of Wuhan Metro. It entered revenue service on December 28, 2016. It is located in Dongxihu District.

== Station layout ==
G	Concourse	Exits A-C
B1	Northbound	← Line 2 towards Tianhe International Airport (Hongtu Boulevard)
B1	Island platform, doors will open on the left
B1	Southbound	Line 2 towards Fozuling (Jinyintan) →

== Gallery ==
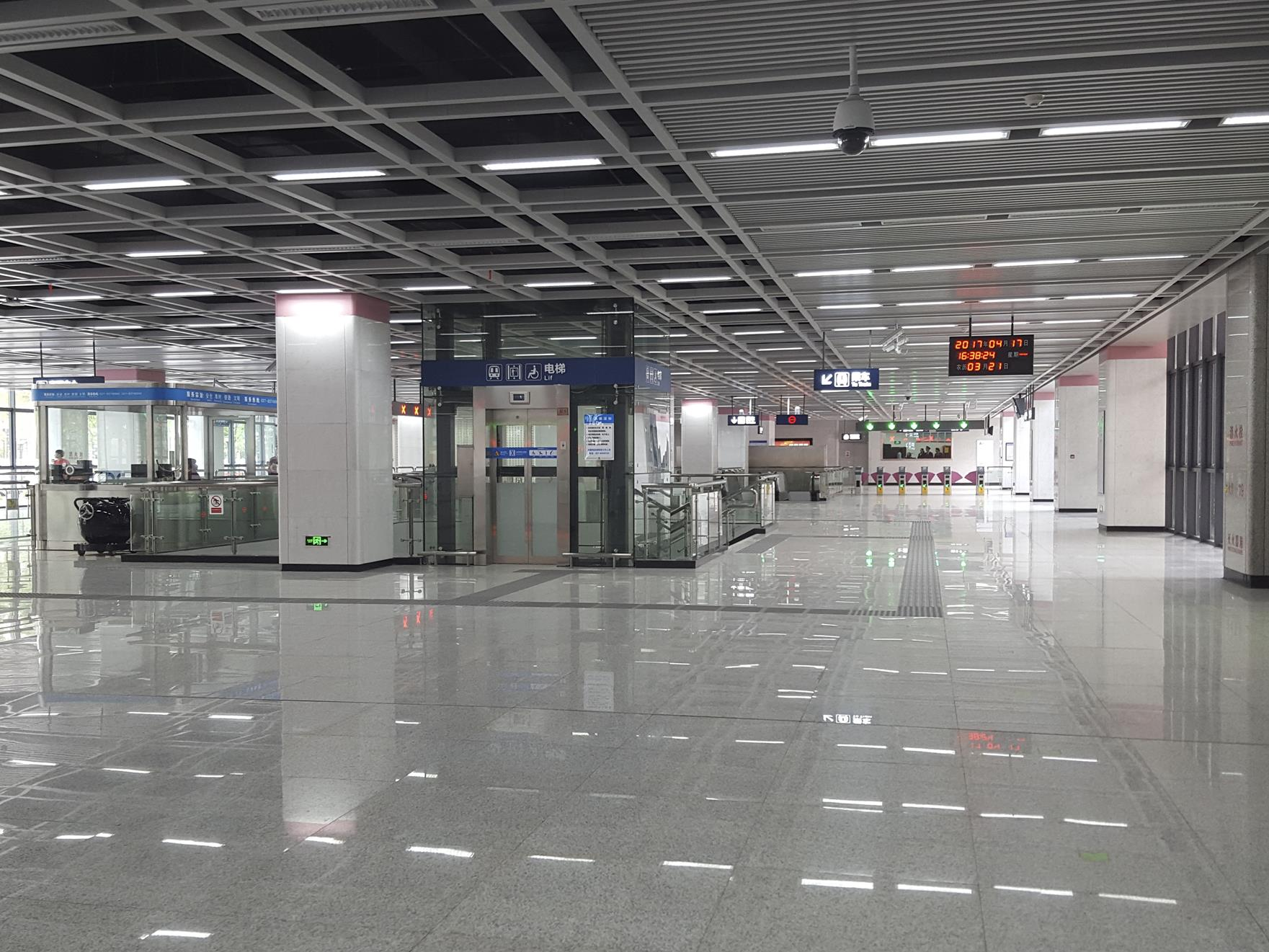
Concourse
