= Garden Expo North station =

Metro station in Wuhan, China

Garden Expo North 园博园北 metro
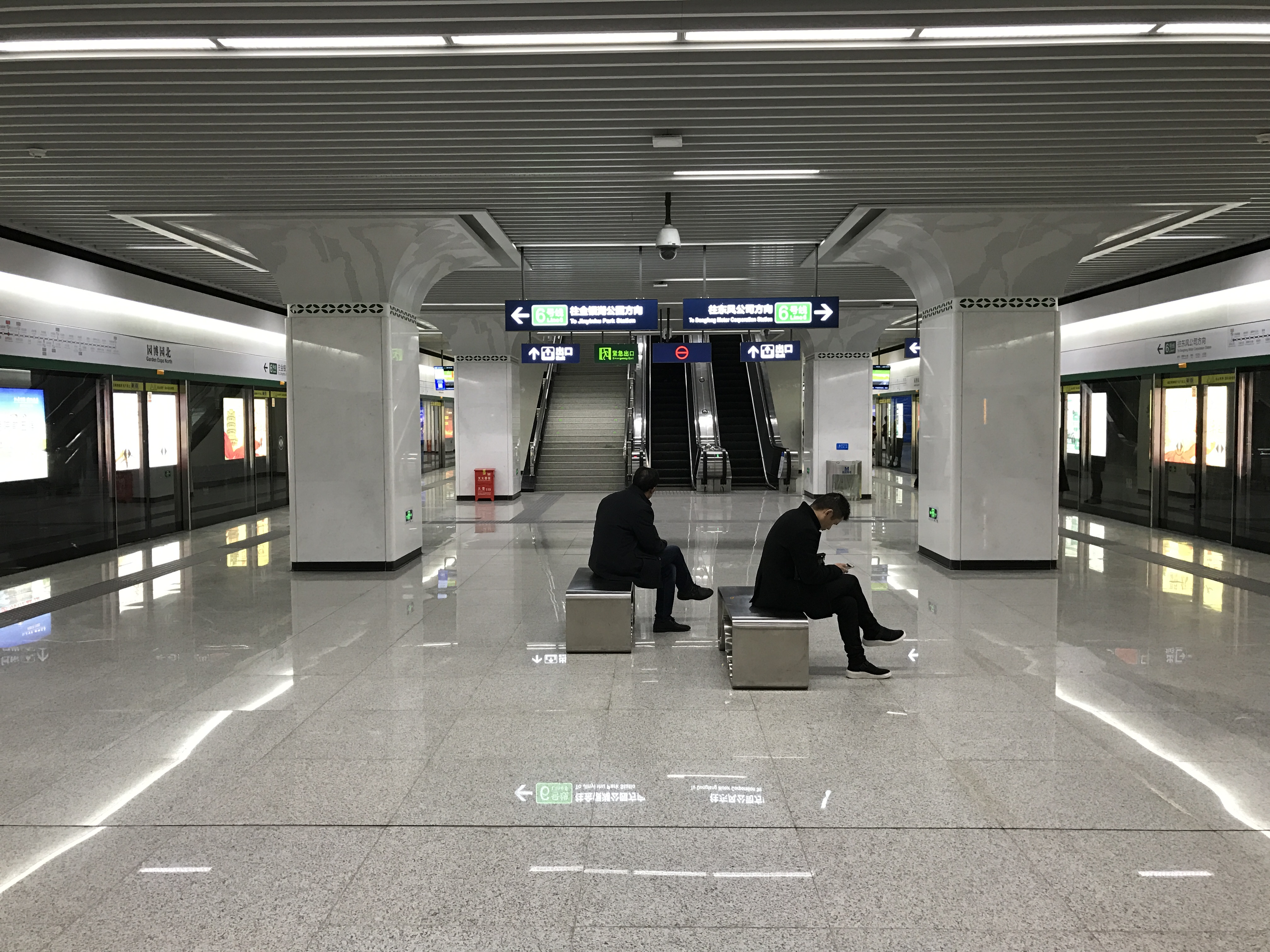
- Line 6 platform

General information
- Location: Dongxihu District, Wuhan, Hubei; China
- Coordinates: 30.6403°N 114.2177°E
- Operated by: Wuhan Metro Co., Ltd
- Lines: Line 6 Line 7
- Platforms: 4 (2 island platforms)

Construction
- Structure type: Underground

History
- Opened: December 28, 2016 (Line 6); October 1, 2018 (Line 7)

Services
Preceding station	Wuhan Metro	Following station
Jinyinhu towards Xincheng 11th Road	Line 6	Polytechnic University towards Dongfeng Motor Corporation
Machi towards Huangpi Square	Line 7	Garden Expo towards Qinglongshan Ditiexiaozhen
Location

Garden Expo North Station (Chinese: 园博园北站) is a transfer station on Line 6 and Line 7 of the Wuhan Metro. It entered revenue service on December 28, 2016. It is located in Dongxihu District and was the northern terminus of Line 7 until the extension to Hengdian opened on December 30, 2022.

== Station layout ==
G	Entrances and Exits	Exits A-H, J-L
B1	Concourse	Faregates, Station Agent
B2	Northbound	← Line 7 towards Huangpi Square (Machi)
B2	Island platform, doors will open on the left
B2	Southbound	Line 7 towards Qinglongshan Ditiexiaozhen (Garden Expo) →
B3	Northbound	← Line 6 towards Xincheng 11th Road (Jinyinhu)
B3	Island platform, doors will open on the left
B3	Southbound	Line 6 towards Dongfeng Motor Corporation (Polytechnic University) →

== Gallery ==
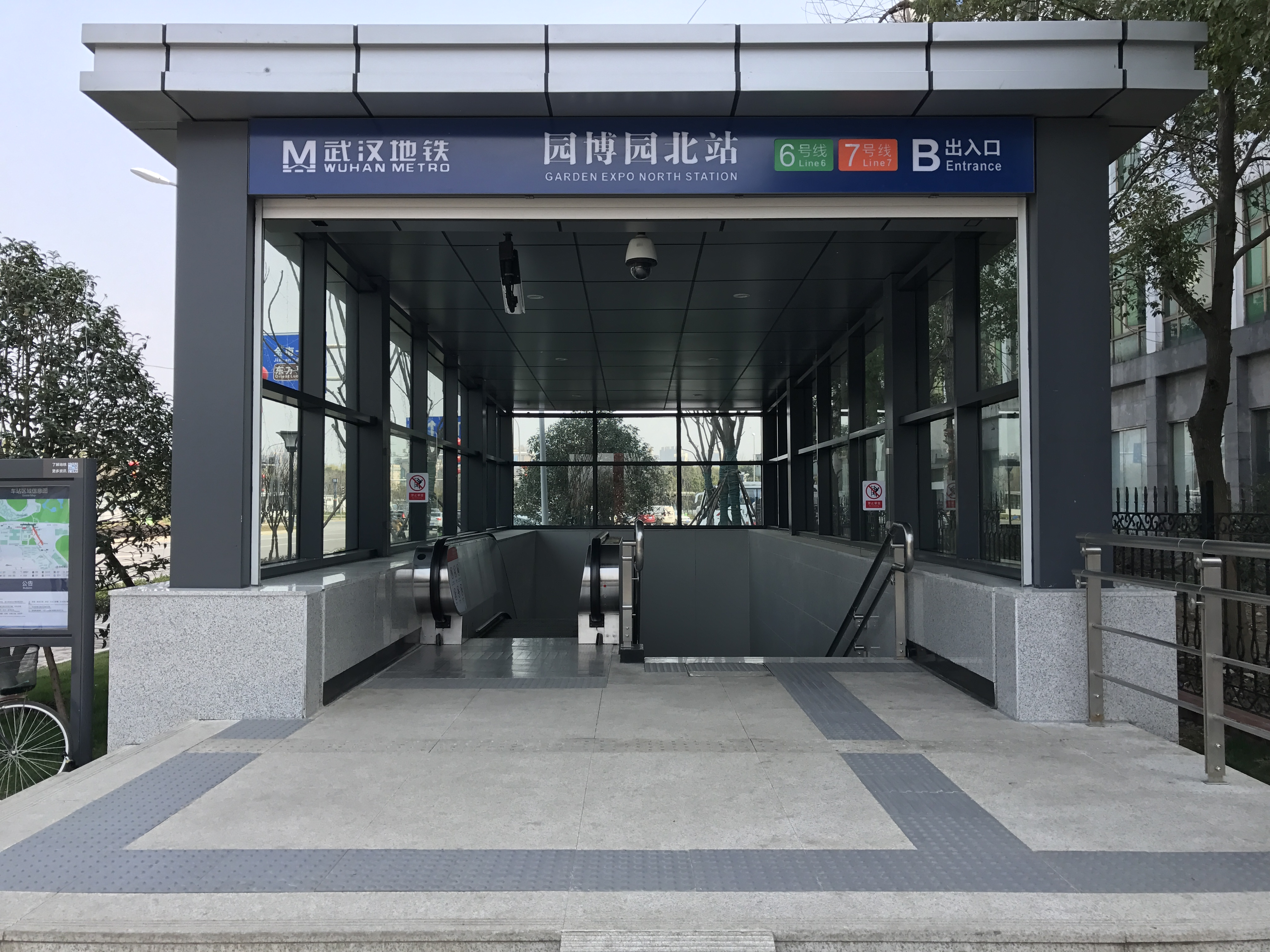
Entrance B

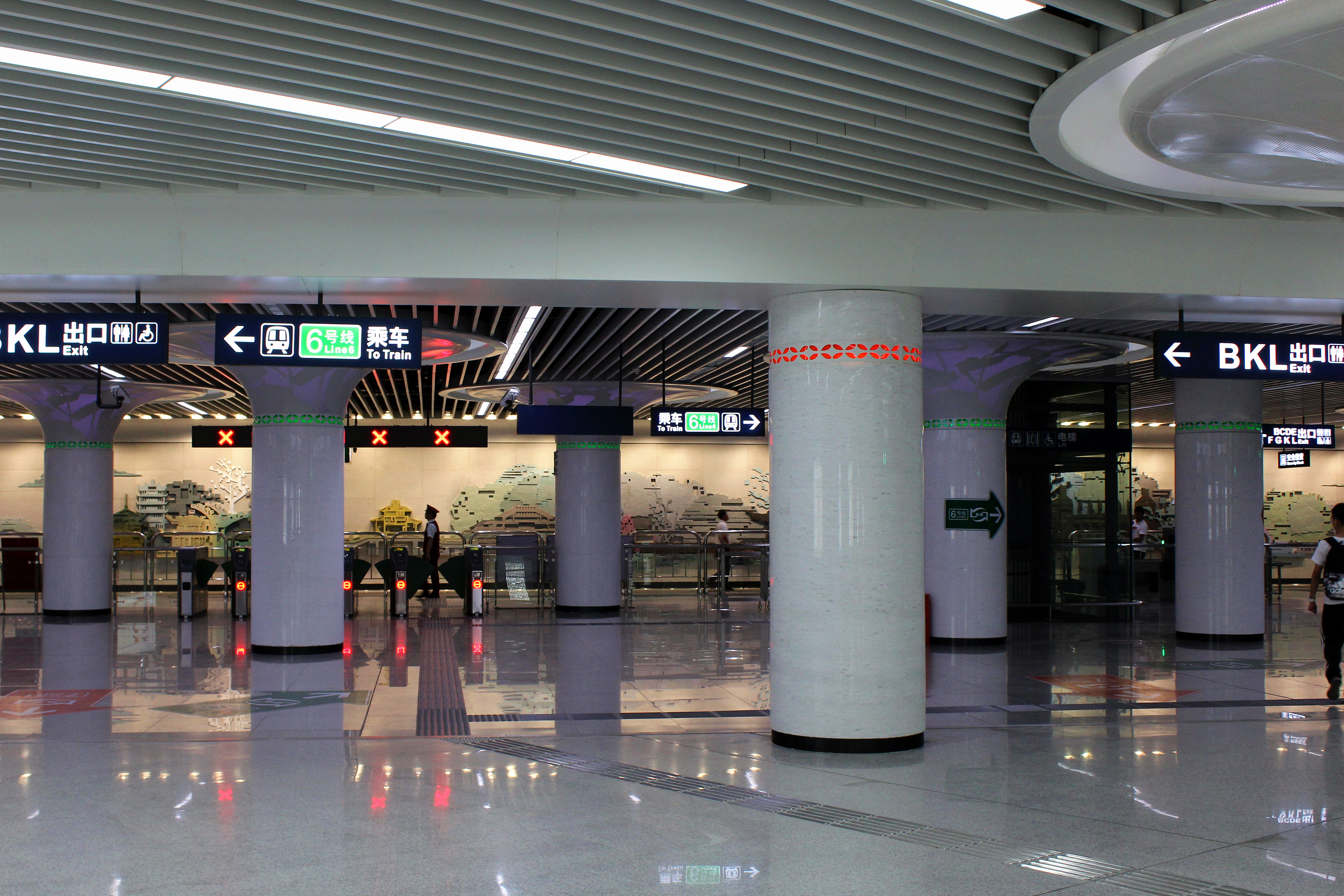
Concourse

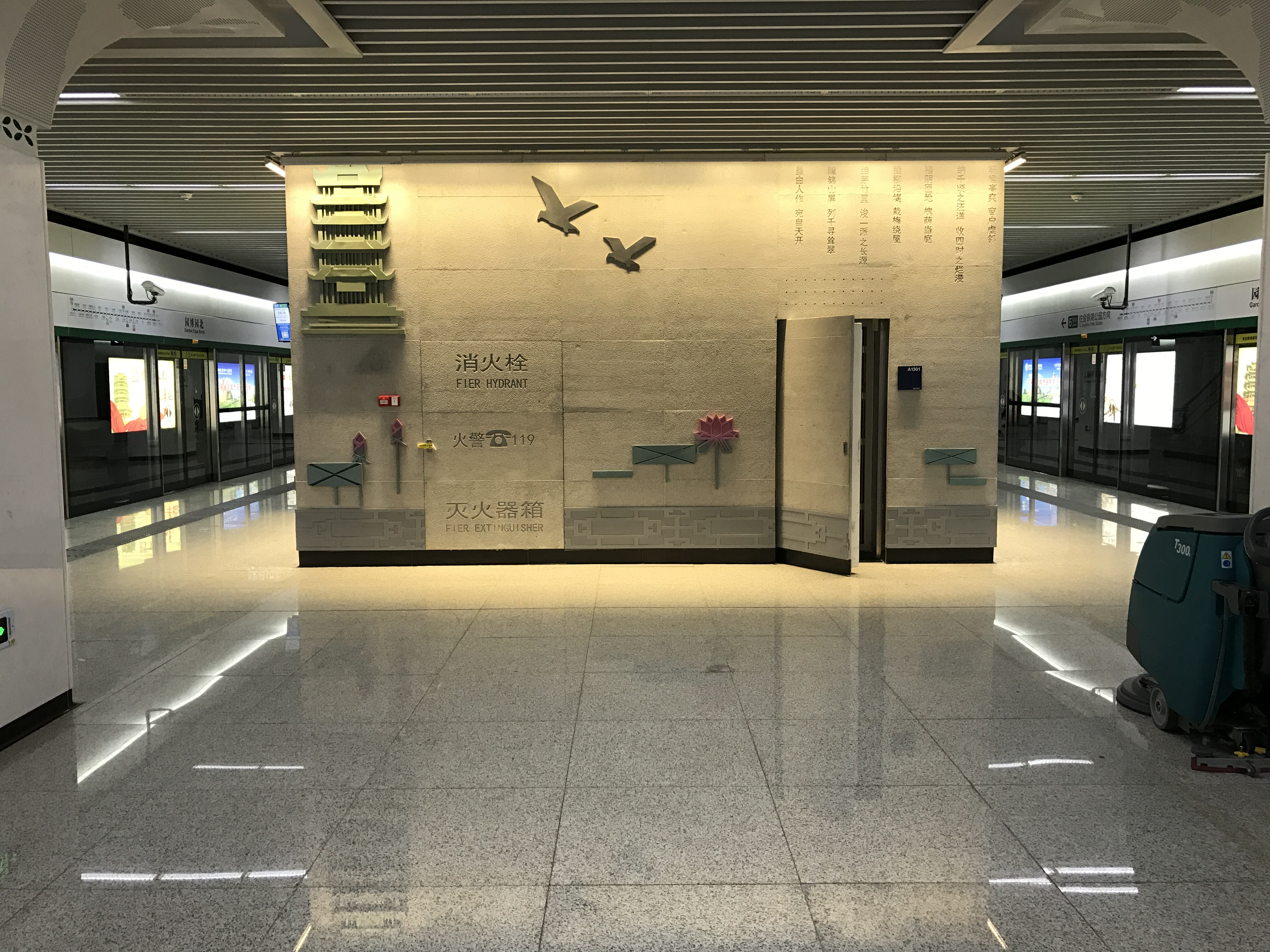
Line 6 platform

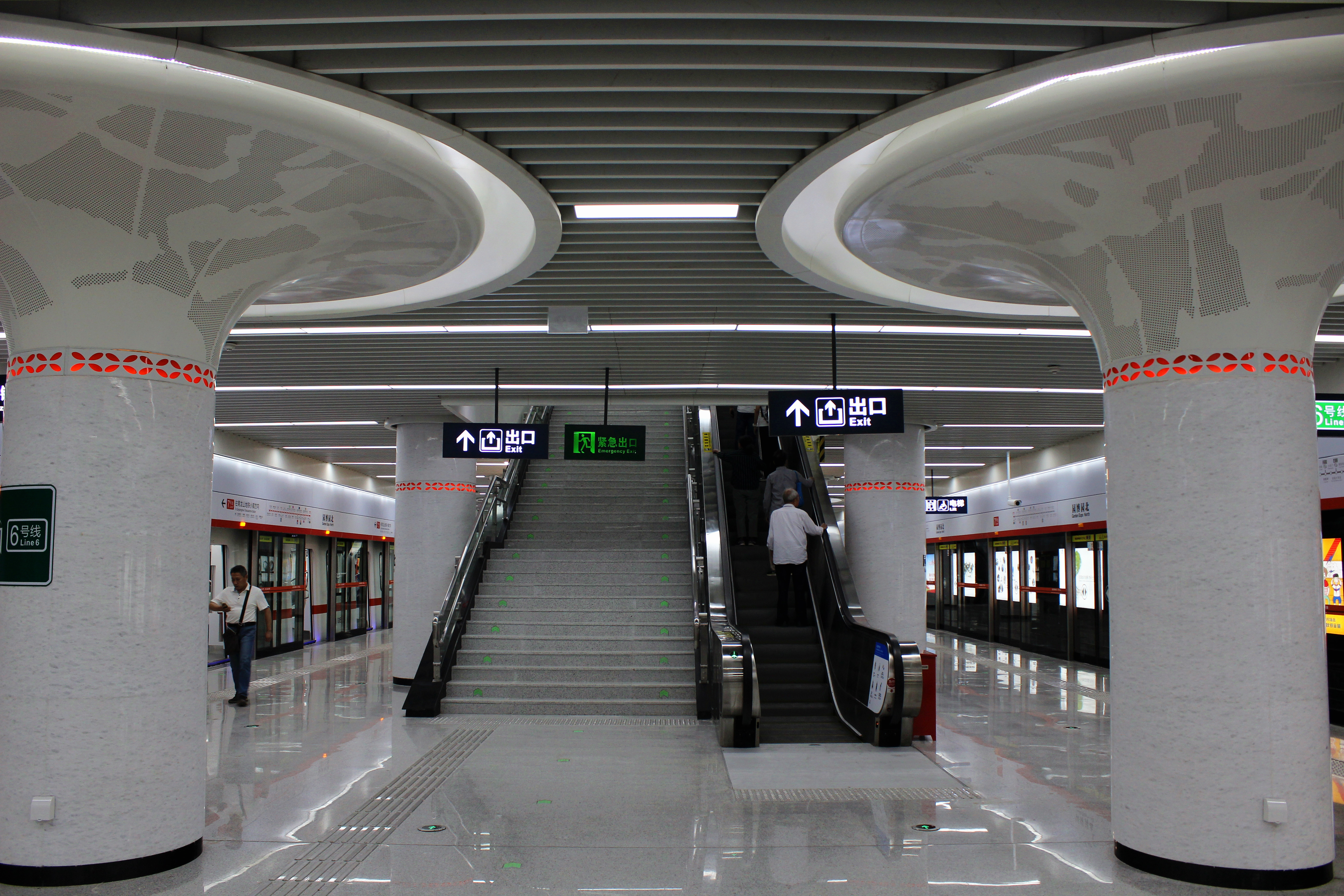
Line 7 platform
