= Matoutan Park station =

Wuhan Metro station

Matoutan Park 码头潭公园
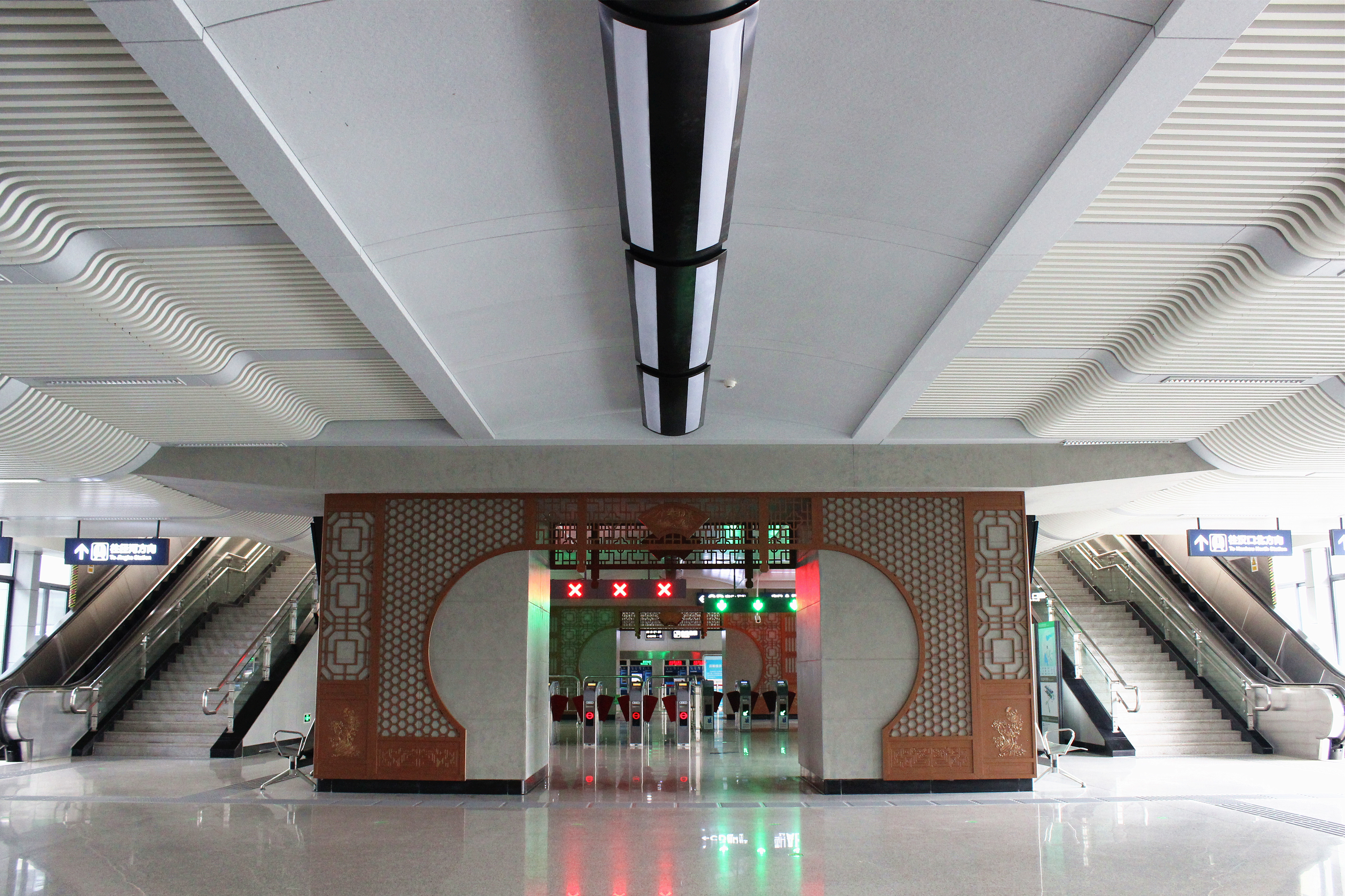

General information
- Location: Dongxihu District, Wuhan, Hubei; China
- Operated by: Wuhan Metro Co., Ltd
- Lines: Line 1 Line 6
- Platforms: 4 (4 side platforms)

Construction
- Structure type: Elevated (Line 1); Underground (Line 6)

History
- Opened: December 26, 2017; 8 years ago (Line 1); December 26, 2021; 4 years ago (Line 6)

Services
Preceding station	Wuhan Metro	Following station
Sandian towards Jinghe	Line 1	Dongwu Boulevard towards Hankou North
Xincheng 11th Road Terminus	Line 6	Five Rings Sports Center towards Dongfeng Motor Corporation
Location

Matoutan Park Station (Chinese: 码头潭公园站) is a station on Line 1 and Line 6 of the Wuhan Metro. It entered revenue service on December 26, 2017. It is located in Dongxihu District.

It was originally planned as Jinshan Avenue Station (Chinese: 金山大道站).

== Station layout ==
3F	Side platform, doors open on the right
3F	Westbound	← Line 1 towards Jinghe (Sandian)
3F	Eastbound	Line 1 towards Hankou North (Dongwu Boulevard) →
3F	Side platform, doors open on the right
2F	Concourse	Faregates, Station Agent
G	Entrances and Exits
