= Aier Eye Hospital =

Chinese ophthalmology chain operator

Aier Eye Hospital Group Co., Ltd.
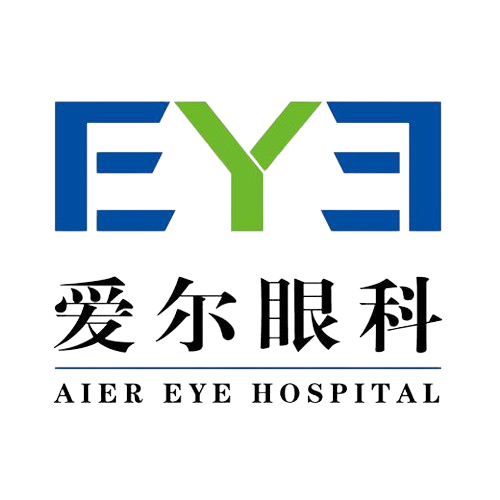

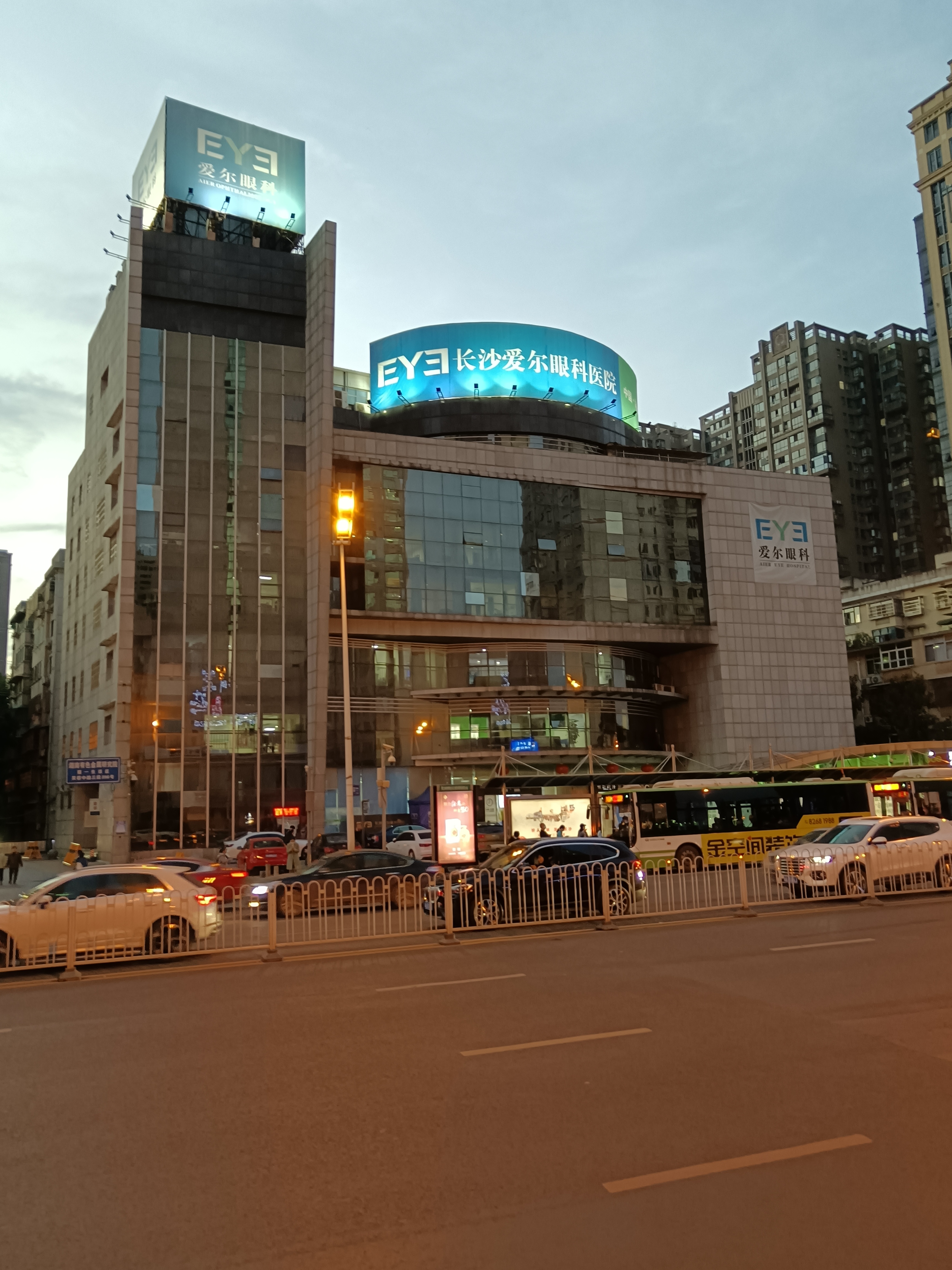
- Hospital in Changsha
- Native name: 爱尔眼科医院集团股份有限公司
- Company type: Public
- Traded as: SZSE: 300015; CSI A50
- Industry: Healthcare
- Founded: January 2003; 23 years ago
- Founder: Chen Bang
- Headquarters: Changsha, Hunan, China
- Key people: Chen Bang (Chairman); Li Li (CEO)
- Revenue: ▲CN¥20.37 billion (2023)
- Net income: ▲CN¥3.66 billion (2023)
- Total assets: ▲CN¥30.19 billion (2023)
- Total equity: ▲CN¥20.02 billion (2023)
- Number of employees: 36,718 (2023)
- Website: aierchina.com

Aier Eye Hospital (Aier; Chinese: 爱尔眼科; pinyin: Àiěr Yǎnkē) is a private Chinese healthcare company headquartered in Changsha, Hunan that operates the largest ophthalmology chain in China.

== Background ==
Aier was founded in 2003 by Chen Bang. Prior to this, he had established several businesses in the medical industry. During the year of establishment. Aier opened its first hospital in Changsha.

In 2006, the International Finance Corporation provided a loan of CNY 64 million (US$8 million) loan to Aier to support its expansion and to increase access to high quality eye care. This loan played a significant role in Aier's growth.

In 2009, Aier held its initial public offering becoming a listed company on the Shenzhen Stock Exchange. It was the first publicly listed medical institution in China.

In 2013, the company established its own school, the Aier School of Ophthalmology at the Central South University. It was the first specialised ophthalmic college in China. In the same year it also established the College of Optometry with Hubei University of Science and Technology.

In 2015, Aier acquired Hong Kong Asia Medical Group to enter the Hong Kong market.

In 2017, Aier acquired Clinica Baviera, a Spanish eye clinic which was the largest in Europe. In the same year, Aier acquired an eye clinic in the United States so it start operating in the country.

Aier uses a multi-tier hospital network which previously did not exist in China with Tier IV being the lowest and Tier I being the highest. Its flagship hospital is located in Shanghai.

In December 2019, Aier acquired a 35% stake in SEC Healthcare, a Singaporean company. Its ownership reached 56.63% making it the majority shareholder.

In September 2022, Aier secured CNY 3.5 billion (US$490 million) through a private placement led by ICBC Credit Suisse Asset Management. Its share price increased 3% as a result. The proceeds would be used boost patient capacity and supplement working capital.

== Controversies ==
In 2021, Aier was involved with a dispute with Ai Fen. Aier performed a cataract surgery on Ai Fen in May 2020. Five months after the procedure she complained that she was nearly blind in one eye with her retina having become detached, leading to a dispute over malpractice.

In December 2023, a viral video spread on Chinese social media after it was posted by Ai. It showed a surgeon allegedly punching the patient he was operating on at the time. Aier said the incident took place in a hospital located in Guigang. The patient was an 82-year-old woman and "during the surgery, due to local anaesthesia, the patient had intolerance". As she could only speak a local dialect and did not appear to respond to the doctor's warnings in Mandarin, the surgeon "treated the patient roughly in an emergency situation". The patient sustained bruises on her forehead. Aier apologised and paid CNY 500 (US$70) as compensation according to the patient's son. He also said his mother is now blind in her left eye although its not known if it was due to the incident. Aier stated the hospital failed to report the incident to headquarters as the incident took place in December 2019 but only became known after Ai posted footage of it. As a result, it dismissed the CEO of the hospital as well as suspended the surgeon involved.
