= Ai Fen =

Chinese doctor

- Born: China
- Education: Tongji Medical College
- Occupation: Physician
- Known for: One of the first medical personnel to report SARS-CoV-2 cases and disclose them through group messaging / social media
- Medical career
- Institutions: Central Hospital of Wuhan

Ai Fen (Chinese: 艾芬; pinyin: Ài Fēn) is a Chinese doctor and director of the emergency department of Central Hospital of Wuhan. In December 2019, she was one of the first doctors to encounter pneumonia patients infected with the then-unknown virus, SARS-CoV-2. On 30 December 2019, Ai Fen received a diagnostic report of suspected "Severe Acute Respiratory Syndrome cases". An image of the diagnostic report was shared on WeChat by an ophthalmologist at the hospital, Li Wenliang. The image was then circulated on the internet, leading Ai Fen to be questioned by hospital superiors. She was given the nickname "The Whistle-Giver" (发哨子的人) in an article in the Chinese Renwu (or People) magazine which was censored by the Chinese government but was reposted on the Chinese internet using emojis, Morse code and pinyin to circumvent censorship.

== Early life ==
In 1997, Ai Fen graduated from Tongji Medical College (now a part of Huazhong University of Science and Technology), and worked in the Department of Cardiovascular Medicine of Wuhan Central Hospital. She began serving as the director of the emergency department in 2010.

== COVID-19 outbreak ==
On 18 December 2019, Ai came into contact with the first case of pulmonary infection showing "multiple patchy blurry shadows scattered in lungs" On 27 December, she received a second patient, but this person had no history of contact of Huanan Seafood Wholesale Market. In the afternoon of 30 December, the test result of the second patient showed infection with a coronavirus. When she saw the words "SARS coronavirus, pseudomonas aeruginosa, 46 types of oral / respiratory colonization bacteria" on the test sheet, Ai immediately reported to the hospital's public health department and infection department. She circled the word "SARS", and took an image of it and sent it to a doctor at another hospital in Wuhan. From there it spread throughout medical circles in Wuhan, where it reached Li Wenliang, an ophthalmologist at the hospital. On the afternoon of the same day, Li sent a warning to former classmates over WeChat, which was reposted publicly in large numbers.

On 1 January 2020, Ai again reported to the hospital's public health department and medical office the news of the admission of multiple patients by a clinic owner near the South China Seafood Market, hoping to attract attention. She worried, "Once emergency doctors or nurses get sick, it would be a lot of trouble." Afterwards, Ai was interviewed by the hospital's supervision department, and said that she had suffered "unprecedented and very severe rebuke". According to Ai, the hospital officials accused her of spreading rumor as a professional.

On the morning of 11 January, Ai received the news that Hu Ziwei, a nurse of the emergency department, had been infected. Ai called her superiors immediately and the hospital had an emergency meeting, in which the officials directed to change the medical observations of the infected nurse from "viral pulmonary infection?" to "spread-out pulmonary infection." In a meeting on 16 January, officials of the hospitals insisted on denying the existence of transfer of this virus infection among humans.

On 13 February, Hubei Daily published a close-up report on Ai Fen, which praised her. Later, rumors had it that Ai Fen has died of the coronavirus. On 20 February, Ai Fen clarified that she was not sick and was still working as a doctor fighting the virus.

On 8 March, People's Daily published a report from Xinhua News Agency praising Ai Fen as a "heroine [who] has been standing and working hard for more than 40 days and nights".

== The "whistle-blower" incident ==
After sharing a photograph of coronavirus lab results on 30 December 2019, it was later reported that on 2 January 2020, Ai was summoned by Cai Li, party chief of Wuhan Central Hospital, and was threatened into silence about the report. Cai was later fired.

On 10 March 2020, the People magazine in China interviewed Ai and published her first-person account in its March article "The Whistle-Blower" (发哨子的人). However, the report was forcibly removed within three hours of its publication on 10 March. The original report on the WeChat public account of the journal was also deleted before noon. The mainland media that forwarded the article also deleted the article. The official website of the China Human Care Association Hospital Humanities Committee, headed by the Chinese National Health Commission, eventually reprinted the report under the header 「如果这些医生都能够得到及时的提醒，或许就不会有这一天」 ("Had doctors been notified promptly, this day might never have come"; a quote from Ai Fen's account), and thanked the reporters.

Protesting against the censorship, Chinese Internet users started to pass the article through means such as braille, emoji, morse code and seal script. It has also been translated into English, German, Japanese, elven runes, and the same format as sequences of DNA.

== Dispute with Aier Eye Hospital ==
In 2021, she was involved in a high-profile medical dispute with Aier Eye Hospital. The private hospital performed a cataract surgery on Ai Fen in May 2020. Five months after the procedure she complained that she was nearly blind in one eye with her retina having become detached, leading to a dispute with the hospital over malpractice. She had to stop working after the surgery and during her recovery became too weak to hold her own child, resulting in a mental breakdown. She also said she could no longer walk unaccompanied by family.

== See also ==
- Li Wenliang
