= Jinyintan station =

Wuhan Metro station

Jinyintan 金银潭 metro
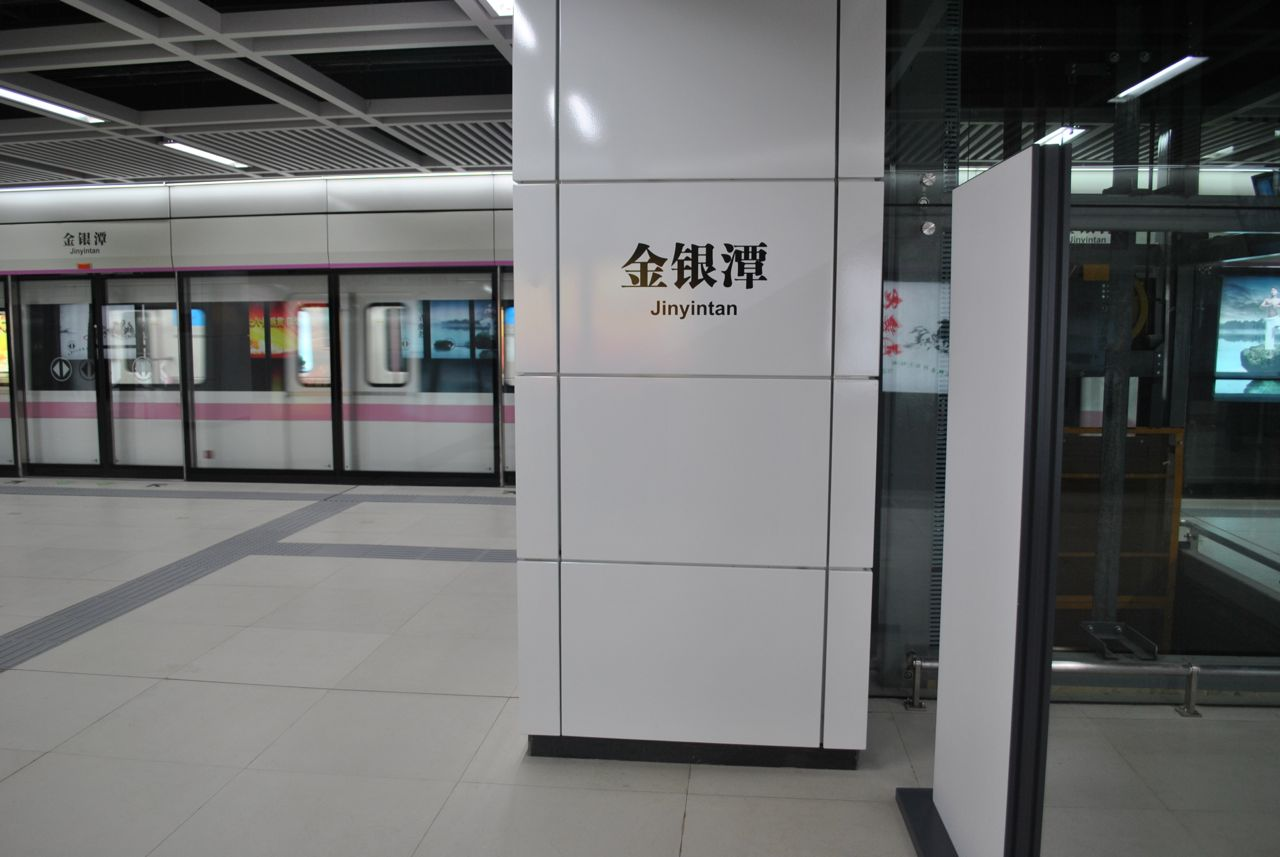

General information
- Location: Dongxihu District, Wuhan, Hubei; China
- Coordinates: 30°39′10″N 114°14′17″E
- Operated by: Wuhan Metro Co., Ltd
- Line: Line 2
- Platforms: 2 (1 island platform)

Construction
- Structure type: Underground

History
- Opened: December 28, 2012 (Line 2)

Services
Preceding station	Wuhan Metro	Following station
Changqingcheng towards Tianhe International Airport	Line 2	Changqing Huayuan towards Fozuling
Location

Jinyintan Station (Chinese: 金银潭站) is a station on Line 2 of Wuhan Metro. It entered revenue service on December 28, 2012. It is located in Dongxihu District.

== Station layout ==
G	Concourse	Exits A, B
B1	Northbound	← Line 2 towards Tianhe International Airport (Changqingcheng)
B1	Island platform, doors will open on the left
B1	Southbound	Line 2 towards Fozuling (Changqing Huayuan) →

== Gallery ==
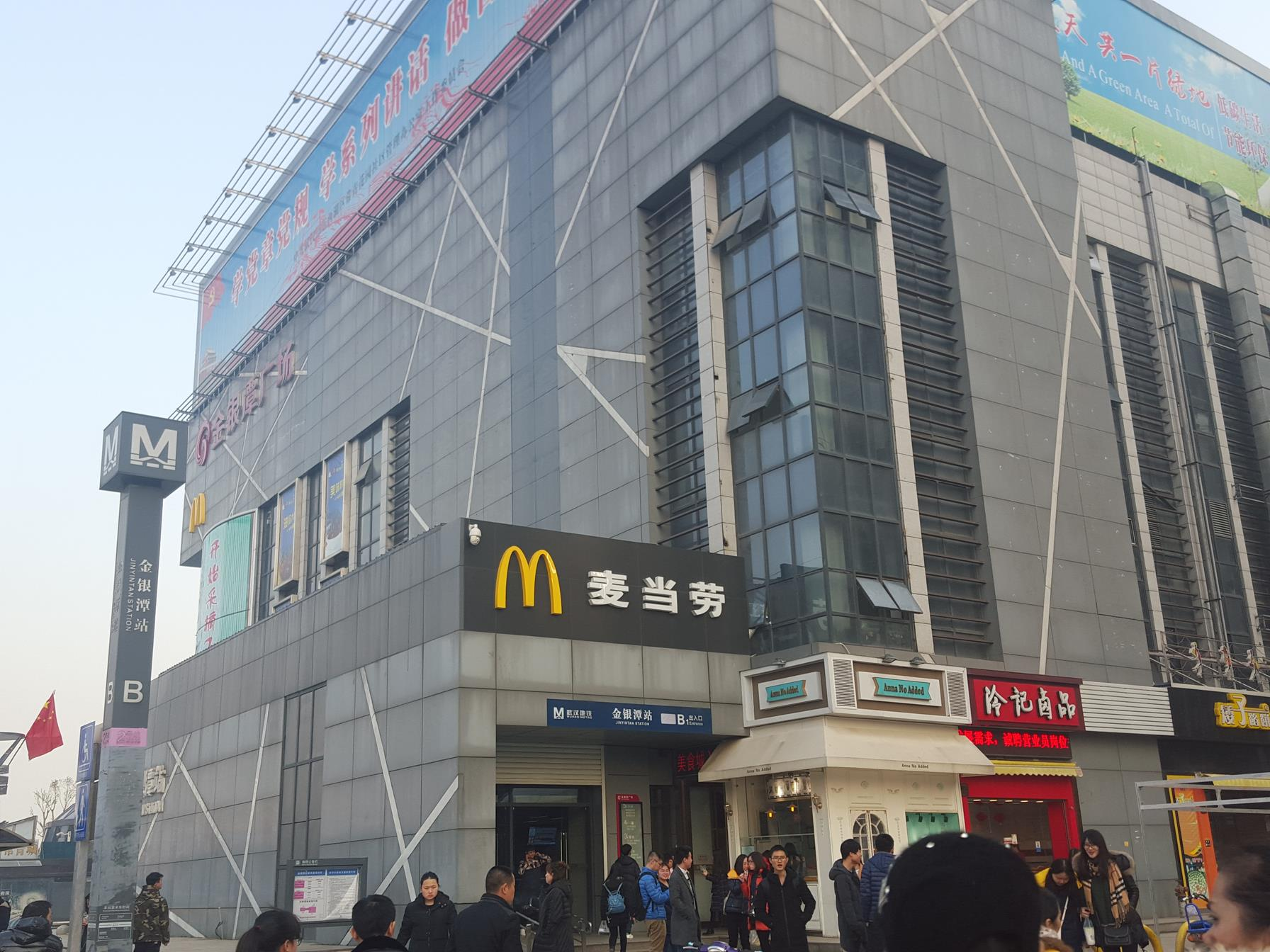
Entrance B1

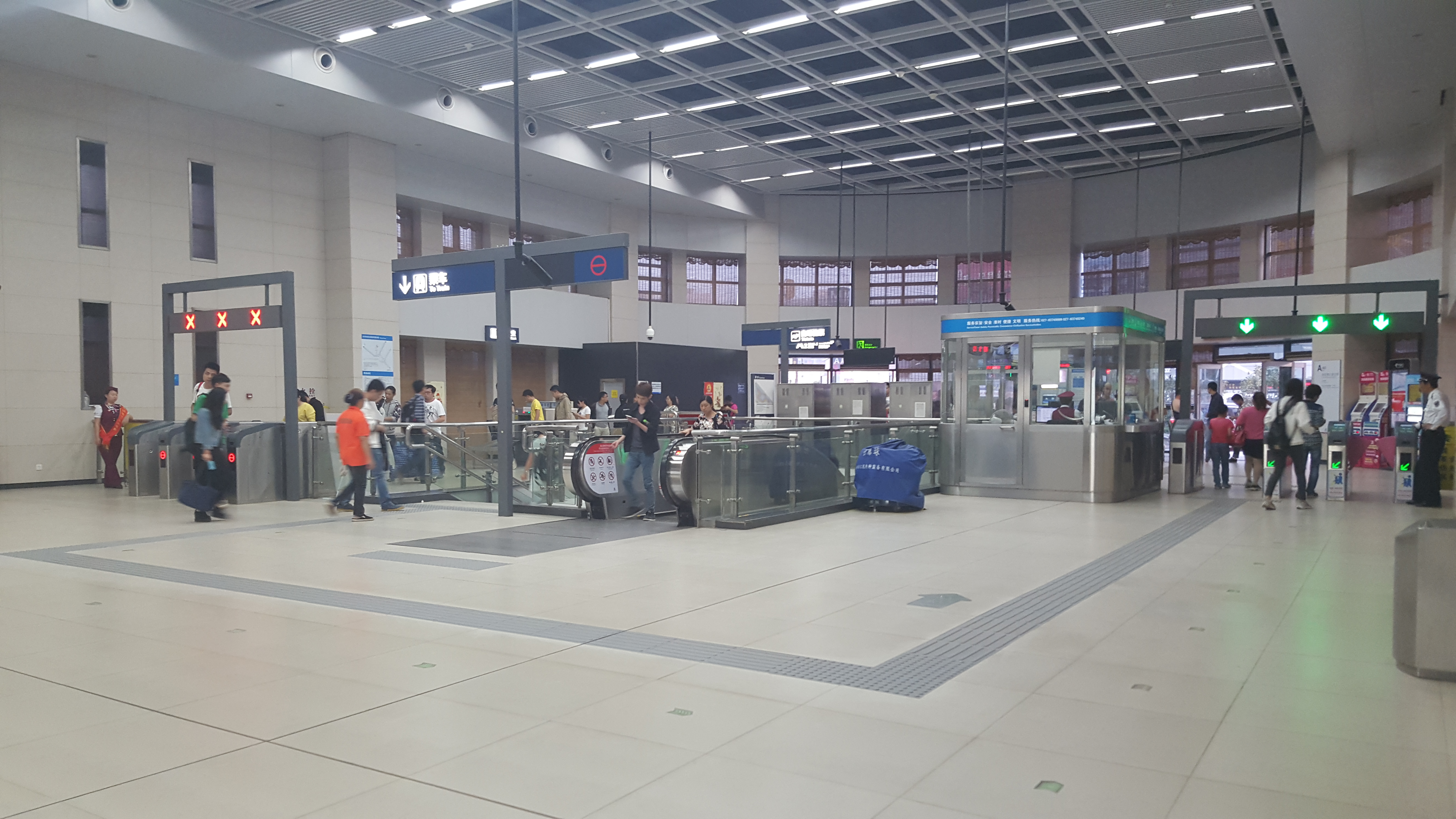
Concourse

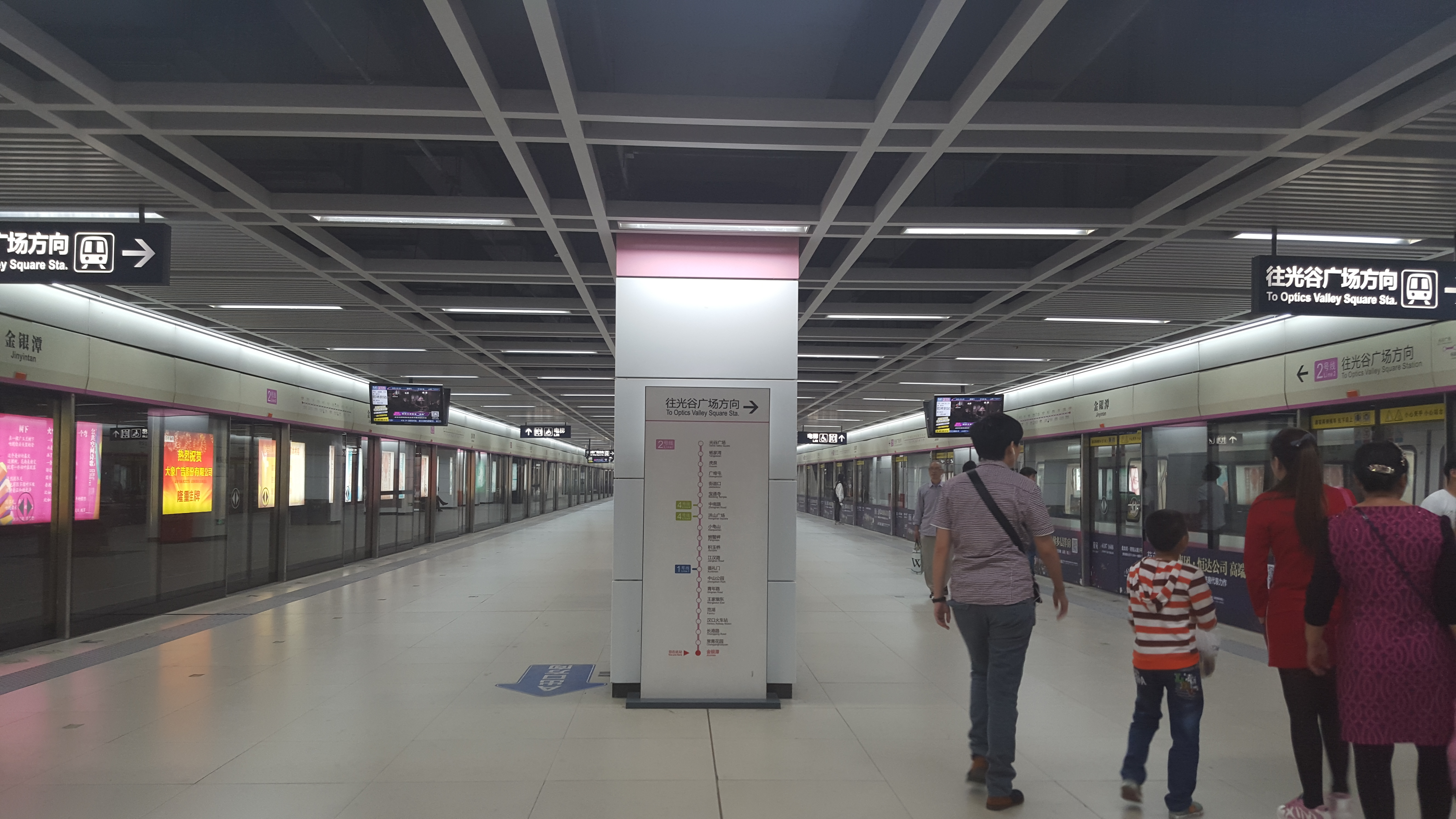
Platform
