= Jiangjunlu Subdistrict =

Jiangjunlu Subdistrict 将军路街道
- Subdistrict
- Location of Jiangjunlu Subdistrict in Hubei
- Coordinates: 30°39′3″N 114°14′52″E
- Country: China
- Province: Hubei
- Prefecture-level city: Wuhan
- District: Dongxihu District
- Time zone: UTC+8 (China Standard)

Jiangjunlu Subdistrict (simplified Chinese: 将军路街道; traditional Chinese: 將軍路街道; pinyin: Jiāngjūnlù Jiēdào) is a subdistrict in Dongxihu District, Wuhan, Hubei, China.
