= Jinghe Subdistrict, Wuhan =

Jinghe Subdistrict 径河街道
- Subdistrict
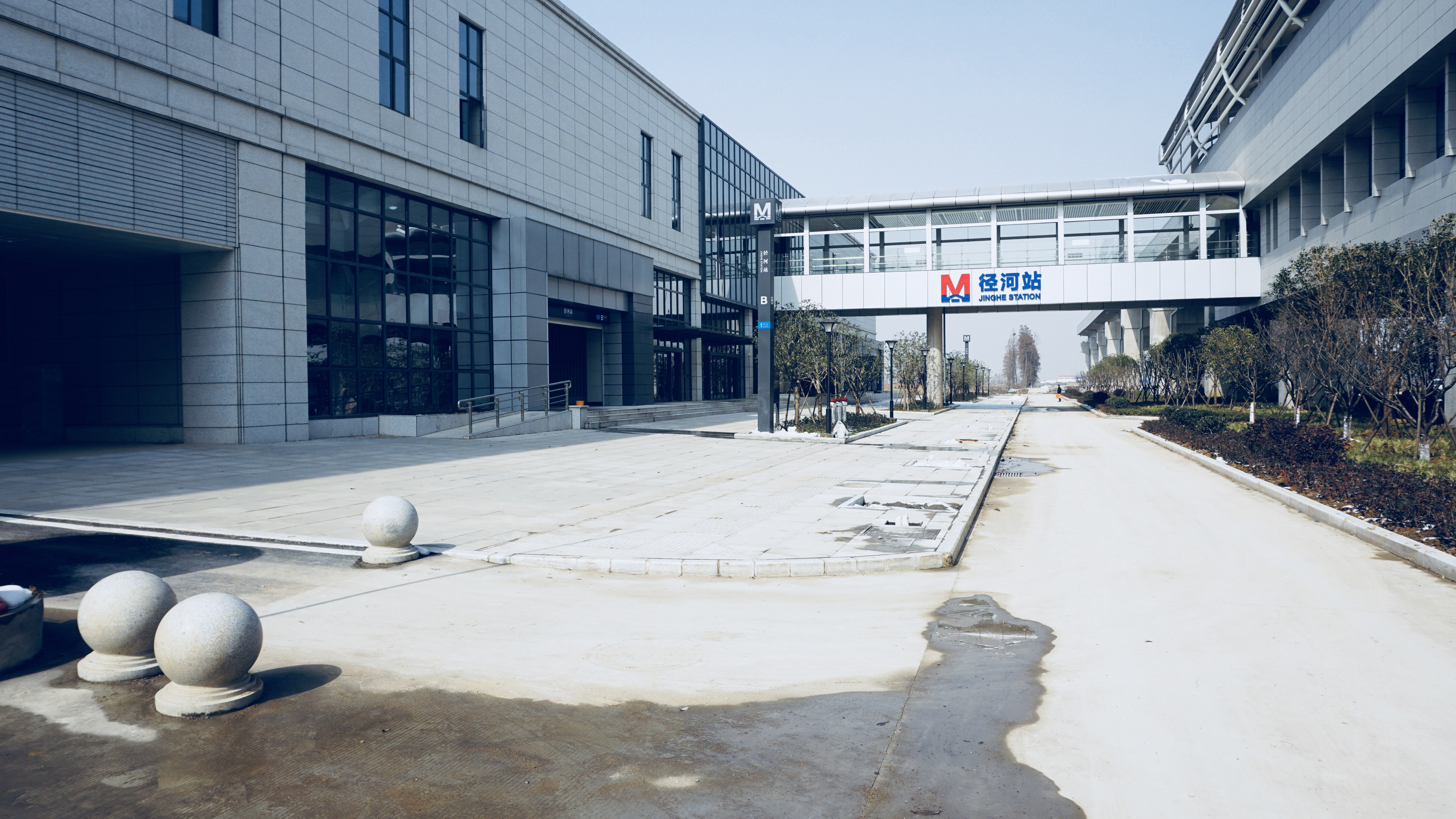
- Jinghe station

- Location in Hubei
- Coordinates: 30°40′55″N 114°9′32″E
- Country: People's Republic of China
- Province: Hubei
- Prefecture-level city: Wuhan
- District: Dongxihu District
- Time zone: UTC+8 (China Standard)

Jinghe Subdistrict (Chinese: 径河街道; pinyin: Jìnghé Jiēdào) is a subdistrict in Dongxihu District, Wuhan, Hubei, China. As of 2020, it administers the following fifteen residential communities:

- Shizi Road Community (十字路社区)
- Mintian Community (民田社区)
- Yongfeng Community (永丰社区)
- Xianfeng Community (先锋社区)
- Xinhe Community (新河社区)
- Xihu Community (西湖社区)
- Guantangjiao Community (官塘角社区)
- Shijiapo Community (石家坡社区)
- Daoxiang Community (稻香社区)
- Lianhuahu Community (莲花湖社区)
- Haijingbeiqu Community (海景北区社区)
- Dianli Community (电犁社区)
- Jinlongwan Community (金龙湾社区)
- Sailuocheng Community (赛洛城社区)
- Changdundi Community (长墩堤社区)

== See also ==
- List of township-level divisions of Hubei
