= Central Hospital of Wuhan =

Hospital in Wuhan, Hubei, China

Geography
- Location: Jiang'an District, Wuhan, Hubei, China
- Coordinates: 30.5842°N 114.28934°E

History
- Former name: Catholic Hospital
- Constructed: 1880
- Opened: 1880

Links
- Website: www.zxhospital.com
- Lists: Hospitals in China
Central Hospital of Wuhan
- Simplified Chinese: 武汉市中心医院
- Traditional Chinese: 武漢市中心醫院
Transcriptions
Standard Mandarin
- Hanyu Pinyin: Wǔhànshì Zhōngxīn Yīyuàn
Alternative Chinese name
- Simplified Chinese: 武汉市第二医院
- Traditional Chinese: 武漢市第二醫院
Transcriptions
Standard Mandarin
- Hanyu Pinyin: Hànkǒu Tiānzhǔtáng Yīyuàn

The Central Hospital of Wuhan (Chinese: 武汉市中心医院) is a tertiary hospital located in Jiang'an District in Wuhan, Hubei, China. It was established in 1880 as a clinic under Hankou's Catholic church. In 1893, it was later expanded and renamed as Catholic Hospital.

On 15 December 2019, what would be the first documented COVID-19 patients were admitted here.

== Notable staff ==
The hospital was where staff director of the emergency department, Ai Fen, and ophthalmologist Li Wenliang became aware of a viral outbreak that was later linked to the COVID-19 pandemic in China and beyond. Li later contracted the virus from a patient and died at the hospital on February 7, 2020.
