= Li Wenliang =

Chinese ophthalmologist (1985–2020)

Lǐ Wénliàng
- 李文亮
- Born: 12 October 1985; Beizhen, Jinzhou, Liaoning, China
- Died: 7 February 2020 (aged 34); Wuhan, Hubei, China
- Cause of death: COVID-19
- Education: Wuhan University (MMed)
- Occupation: Ophthalmologist
- Years active: 2011–2020
- Known for: Warning people about COVID-19 before it became a pandemic
- Spouse: Fu Xuejie
- Children: 2

Li Wenliang
- Chinese: 李文亮
Transcriptions
Standard Mandarin
- Hanyu Pinyin: Lǐ Wénliàng
- IPA: [lì wə̌n.liaŋ]
Yue: Cantonese
- Jyutping: lei5 man4 loeng6

Li Wenliang (Chinese: 李文亮; 12 October 1985 – 7 February 2020) was a Chinese ophthalmologist who warned his colleagues about early COVID-19 infections in Wuhan.

On 30 December 2019, Wuhan Centres for Disease Prevention and Control (Wuhan CDC) issued emergency warnings to local hospitals about a number of mysterious "pneumonia" cases discovered in the city in the previous week. On the same day, Li, who worked at the Central Hospital of Wuhan, received an internal diagnostic report of a suspected severe acute respiratory syndrome (SARS) patient from other doctors, which he in turn shared with his Wuhan University alumni through a WeChat group.

Li was dubbed a whistleblower when that shared report later circulated publicly, despite his messaging to his alumni WeChat group to not spread the message outside of the group with the exception to only "remind their family members and loved ones to be on the alert". Li did not appear to have intentions of warning the wider public. Rumors of a deadly SARS outbreak subsequently spread on Chinese social media platforms; Wuhan police summoned and admonished him and seven other doctors on 3 January for "making false comments on the Internet about unconfirmed SARS outbreak."

The outbreak was later confirmed not to be SARS, but rather a new coronavirus, SARS-CoV-2. Li returned to work and later contracted COVID-19, the disease caused by the virus, from a patient who was not known to be infected. He died from the disease on 7 February 2020, at age 34. A subsequent Chinese official inquiry exonerated him; Wuhan police formally apologized to his family and revoked his admonishment on 19 March. In April 2020, Li was posthumously awarded the May Fourth Medal by the government. By early June 2020, five more doctors from the Wuhan hospital had died from COVID-19.

== Early life ==
Li Wenliang was born on 12 October 1985 in a Manchu family in Beizhen, Jinzhou, Liaoning. His parents were former state enterprise workers and both lost their jobs in the 'wave of laid-offs' in the 1990s. He attended Beizhen High School (北镇市高级中学) and graduated in 2004 with an excellent academic record. He attended Wuhan University School of Medicine as a medical student in a seven-year combined bachelor's and master's degree program. He joined the Chinese Communist Party (CCP) in his second year. His mentor praised him as a diligent and honest student. His college classmates said he was a basketball fan.

== Career ==
After graduation in 2011, Li worked at the Xiamen Eye Center of Xiamen University for three years. In 2014, Li became an ophthalmologist at Wuhan Central Hospital in Wuhan.

=== Role in the COVID-19 pandemic ===
Li Wenliang's messages in the "Wuhan University Clinical Medicine 2004" WeChat group
on 30 December 2019

(CST 17:43)

- Li: There are 7 confirmed cases of SARS at Huanan Seafood Market.
- Li: (Picture of diagnosis report)
- Li: (Video of CT scan results)
- Li: They are being isolated in the emergency department of our hospital's Houhu Hospital District.

(CST 18:42)

- Someone: Be careful, our class group chat got shut down.
- Li: The latest news is, it has been confirmed that they are coronavirus infections, but the exact virus is being subtyped.
- Li: Don't circulate the information outside of this group, tell your family and loved ones to take precautions.
- Li: In 1937, coronaviruses were first isolated from chicken...

— Source: screenshots in The Beijing News report

In early December, doctors in Wuhan were puzzled by many "pneumonia" cases of unknown cause. On 30 December 2019, the Wuhan CDC sent out an internal memo to all Wuhan hospitals to be alerted and started an investigation into the exact cause of the pneumonia. The alert and subsequent news reports were immediately published on ProMED (a program of the International Society for Infectious Diseases). On the same day, Li saw a patient's report which showed a positive result with a high confidence level for SARS coronavirus tests. The report had originated from Ai Fen, director of the emergency department at Wuhan Central hospital, who became alarmed after receiving laboratory results of a patient whom she had examined who exhibited symptoms akin to influenza resistant to conventional treatment methods. The report contained the phrase "SARS coronavirus." Ai had circled the word "SARS" and sent it to a doctor at another hospital in Wuhan. From there it spread throughout medical circles in the city, where it reached Li. At 17:43, he wrote in a private WeChat group of his medical school classmates: "7 confirmed cases of SARS were reported [to hospital] from Huanan Seafood Market." He also posted the patient's examination report and CT scan image. At 18:42, he added "the latest news is, it has been confirmed that they are coronavirus infections, but the exact virus strain is being subtyped." Li asked the WeChat group members to inform their families and friends to take protective measures whilst requesting discretion from those he shared the information with; he was upset when the discussion gained a wider audience than he had hoped.

After screenshots of his WeChat messages were shared on Chinese Internet and gained more attention, the supervision department of his hospital summoned him for a talk, blaming him for leaking the information. On 3 January 2020, police from the Wuhan Public Security Bureau investigating the case interrogated Li, issued a formal written warning and censuring him for "publishing untrue statements about seven confirmed SARS cases at the Huanan Seafood Market." He was made to sign a letter of admonition promising not to do it again. The police warned him that any recalcitrant behavior would result in a prosecution.

Li returned to work at the hospital and contracted the virus on 8 January. On 31 January, he published his experience in the police station with the letter of admonition on social media. His post went viral and users questioned why the doctors who gave earlier warnings were silenced by the authorities.

==== Reaction ====
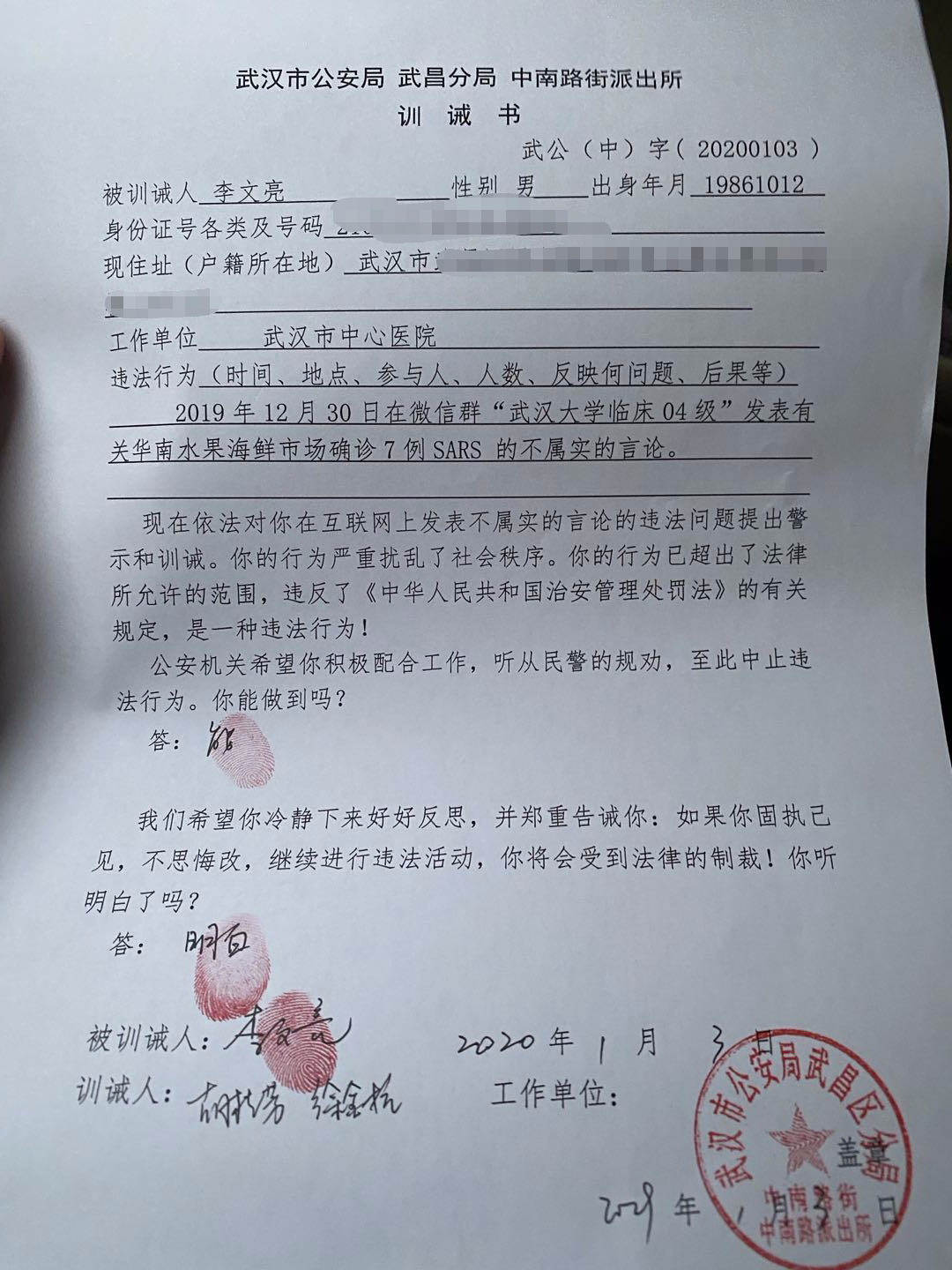
The letter of admonition issued by the Wuhan Police Bureau (translation) ordering Li to stop "spreading rumors" about SARS, co-signed by Li and two officers. Li uploaded it to his Sina Weibo account.

The existence of Li's personal blog where he documented his discoveries was reported by the Italian newspaper La Stampa on 1 February. Li later responded that he did not know whether he was one of the so-called "rumor mongers," but that he had been admonished for claiming a SARS outbreak, which at that time was unconfirmed. The police punishment of Li for "rumor mongering" was aired on China Central Television, signaling central government endorsement for the reprimand, according to two reporters for the South China Morning Post.

On 4 February, the Chinese Supreme People's Court said that the eight Wuhan citizens should not have been punished as what they said was not entirely false. It wrote on social media: "It might have been a fortunate thing if the public had believed the 'rumors' then and started to wear masks and carry out sanitization measures, and avoid the wild animal market."

Li told Caixin that he had been worried the hospital would punish him for "spreading rumors," but felt relieved after the top court publicly criticized the police, and said, "I think there should be more than one voice in a healthy society, and I don't approve of using public power for excessive interference."

On 31 December 2019, Yijun Luo, then deputy director of the Centers for Disease Control of the Ministry of Health and Welfare of Taiwan, was browsing the Internet when he discovered that an Internet user had posted a warning message from Li about a new SARS-like virus, which alerted him. After researching the message, Luo considered it highly credible and initiated a series of epidemic prevention procedures, and at a press conference on 16 April 2020, Luo expressed his gratitude to Li.

== Illness and death ==
=== COVID-19 infection ===
On 8 January 2020, Li contracted COVID-19 unwittingly while treating an infected patient at his hospital. The patient suffered from acute angle-closure glaucoma and developed a fever the next day that Li then suspected was coronavirus-related. Li developed a fever and cough two days later which soon became severe. Doctor Yu Chengbo, a Zhejiang medical expert sent to Wuhan, told media that the glaucoma patient whom Li saw on 8 January was a storekeeper at Huanan Seafood Market with a high viral load, which could have exacerbated Li's infection.

On 12 January 2020, Li was admitted to intensive care at Houhu Hospital District, Wuhan Central Hospital, where he was quarantined and treated. He tested positive for the virus on 30 January and was formally diagnosed with the virus infection on 1 February. While hospitalized, Li posted a message online vowing to return to the front lines after his recovery.

=== Death ===
On 6 February, while Li was on the phone with a friend, he told the friend that his oxygen saturation had dropped to 85%. Extracorporeal membrane oxygenation (ECMO) was reportedly used to keep him alive. According to China Newsweek, his heartbeat stopped at 21:30. In social media posts, the Chinese state media reported that Li had died, but the posts were soon deleted. Later, Wuhan Central Hospital released a statement contradicting reports of his death: "In the process of fighting the coronavirus, the eye doctor from our hospital Li Wenliang was unfortunately infected. He is now in critical condition and we are doing our best to rescue him." The hospital formally announced that Li had died at 2:58 a.m. on 7 February 2020. During the confusion, more than 17 million people were watching the live stream for updates on his status.

=== Aftermath ===
By early June 2020, five other doctors had died from COVID-19 in the Wuhan hospital, now called the "whistleblower hospital". Hu Weifeng, a urologist and a coworker of Li, was the sixth doctor of the hospital to die from the virus on 2 June 2020, after four months of hospitalization.

=== Reaction ===
Li's death provoked considerable grief and anger on social media which became extended to a demand for freedom of speech. The hashtag #WeWantFreedomOfSpeech (Chinese: #我们要言论自由#; pinyin: Wǒmen yào yánlùn zìyóu) gained over two million views and over 5,500 posts within five hours before it was removed by censors, as were other related hashtags and posts. Wuhan citizens placed flowers and blew whistles at Wuhan Central Hospital, where Li worked and died, as a tribute to him. On the Internet, people spontaneously launched the activity themed "I blew a whistle for Wuhan tonight," where everyone kept all the lights off in their homes for five minutes, and later blew whistles and waved glitter outside of their windows for five minutes to mourn Li. Many people left messages in response to Li's last post on Sina Weibo, some lamenting his death and expressing anger at the authorities. He was also proclaimed an "ordinary hero." The World Health Organization posted on Twitter saying that it was "deeply saddened by the passing of Dr Li Wenliang" and "we all need to celebrate work that he did on #2019nCoV."

Although there was no official apology from the city of Wuhan for reprimanding Li, the Wuhan municipal government and the Health Commission of Hubei made statements of tribute to Li and condolences to his family. Beyond Wuhan, the National Health Commission did likewise. China's highest anti-corruption body, the National Supervisory Commission, has initiated a "comprehensive investigation" into the issues involving Li. Qin Qianhong, a law professor at Wuhan University expressed his concern that, unless properly managed, public anger over Li's death could explode in a similar way as the death of Hu Yaobang.

A group of Chinese academics, led by Tang Yiming – head of the school of Chinese classics at Central China Normal University in Wuhan – published an open letter urging the government to both protect free speech and apologize for Li's death. The letter emphasized the right to free speech, ostensibly guaranteed by the Chinese constitution. Tang said that the viral outbreak was a man-made disaster, and that China ought to learn from Li Wenliang. Tang also wrote he felt that senior intellectuals and academics must speak up for the Chinese people and for their own consciences. "We all should reflect on ourselves," he wrote, "and the officials should rue their mistakes even more." The letter alleges that Li Wenliang "is also a victim of speech suppression." Jie Qiao, Academician of the Chinese Academy of Engineering and President of Peking University Third Hospital in Beijing called Li a "whistle-blower dedicating his young life in the front line."

On 7 February 2020, Taiwanese author Yan Zeya (顏擇雅) expressed doubt on the Liberty Times about whether Li should be called a whistleblower, citing his lack of general objection to the government and lack of willingness to expose its dark side.

On 9 February 2020, hundreds of people in New York commemorated Li in a tribute at Central Park. The U.S. Senate introduced a resolution honoring Li and calling for transparency and cooperation from the Chinese government and CCP.

=== Recognition ===
In April, Li was officially honored by the Chinese government as a "martyr", which is the highest honor the government can bestow on a citizen who dies serving China. According to the state-run Xinhua News Agency, he was honored together with 13 other "martyrs", mostly physicians, who died from COVID-19. Chinese internet users continued to leave messages on Li's Weibo page. There were more than one million such messages in the year after his death. According to an analysis by academic Pang Laikwan, the contents of these messages ranged from expressions of gratitude, to exhortations to remember, and everyday greetings and the sharing of everyday happenings. Laikwan writes that the four most frequent terms in these messages were "Dr. Li," "today," "good night," and "hope".

On 3 March, International Journal of Infectious Diseases published an article, wrote "Dr Li Wenliang's example as an astute clinician should inspire all of us to be vigilant, bold and courageous in reporting unusual clinical presentations". Italian author Francesca Cavallo wrote a children's book titled Dr. Li and the crown-wearing virus, featuring Li's story, to help educate children on COVID-19. Fortune magazine ranked Li as No.1 of the "World's 25 Greatest Leaders: Heroes of the pandemic". On 4 May, Matt Pottinger, deputy national security adviser of US, hailed Li during a speech in Mandarin.

In May 2021, Li was posthumously honored with the Paracelsus Medal, the highest honor given by the German Medical Association.

== Personal life ==
When Li began showing symptoms of COVID-19, he booked a hotel room to avoid the possibility of infecting his family, before being hospitalized on 12 January. Despite this precaution, his parents became infected with SARS-CoV-2, although they later recovered.

Li and his wife, Fu Xuejie (付雪洁), had one son, and were expecting their second child at the time of his death. In June 2020, his widow gave birth to a second son.

== See also ==
- Jiang Yanyong
