= Jiang Yanyong =

Chinese physician and whistleblower of SARS epidemic in China (1931–2023)

- Born: 4 October 1931; Hangzhou, Zhejiang, China
- Died: 11 March 2023 (aged 91); Beijing, China
- Education: Yenching University; Peking Union Medical College
- Occupation: Physician
- Known for: Whistleblower regarding the reality of the 2003 SARS outbreak in China
- Political party: Chinese Communist Party

Jiang Yanyong
- Traditional Chinese: 蔣彥永
- Simplified Chinese: 蒋彦永
Transcriptions
Standard Mandarin
- Hanyu Pinyin: Jiǎng Yànyǒng
- Wade–Giles: Chiang Yen-yung

Jiang Yanyong (4 October 1931 – 11 March 2023) was a Chinese physician who publicized a coverup of the severe acute respiratory syndrome (SARS) epidemic in mainland China. Born into the Zhejiang Xingye Bank family, Jiang was the chief physician of the 301 Hospital in Beijing and a senior member of the Chinese Communist Party.

Jiang was under periodic house arrest due to his role in exposing the coverup of SARS outbreak. According to a report in The New York Times, Jiang was portrayed as a bad role model in Chinese educational material, for "harming the interests of the nation".

== Education ==
Jiang attended Yenching University. He chose a career in medicine after seeing an aunt die of tuberculosis. In 1952, he entered Peking Union Medical College.

== Career ==
Jiang joined the People's Liberation Army in 1954 and was assigned to the 301 Hospital (PLA General Hospital) in Beijing. In 1987, Jiang was named the hospital's chief surgeon. He held the military rank of that is equivalent to a US Major General. In June 1989, Jiang witnessed the results of the trauma inflicted on the students during the 1989 Tiananmen Square protests and massacre.

While the SARS virus began spreading in mainland China in late 2002 and early 2003, the number of cases being reported in mainland China was drastically understated by the government. On 4 April 2003, Jiang emailed an 800-word letter to Chinese Central Television -4 (CCTV4) and Phoenix TV (Hong Kong) reporting that fact. Although neither of the two replied or published his letter, the information was leaked to the Western news organizations. On 8 April 2003, Jiang was reached by a journalist from The Wall Street Journal through telephone interview. Later the same day, Susan Jakes, a Time journalist in Beijing also contacted Jiang. Time published the striking news right away with the title of "Beijing's SARS Attack". In this article, Jiang's letter was translated into English and, for the first time, the public was made aware of the actual situation in mainland China. This letter forced the resignation of the Mayor of Beijing and the Minister of Public Health on 21 April 2003. The Chinese government began to actively deal with the growing epidemic. Most public health experts believe that this act prevented the disease from reaching pandemic proportions.

In February 2004, Jiang wrote an open letter to Premier Wen Jiabao, several vice premiers, the Politburo members and many other members of the Chinese government. The letter asked for a re-examination of the responsibility borne by the Chinese government for the Tiananmen Square Massacre. A number of media sources indicate that because of Jiang Yanyong's senior rank the topic of what to do with him was discussed by the Politburo.

On 2 June 2004, two days before the 15th anniversary of the massacre, Jiang Yanyong's family in California reported that he and his wife were missing from their house in Beijing after being arrested and placed under military custody. He was released on 19 July 2004.

In March 2019, he wrote to Chinese Communist Party general secretary Xi Jinping calling the crackdown on student protests in Tiananmen Square a crime. Jiang's friends then reported that they lost contact with him and believed he was under house arrest. In February 2020, it was reported that he "has been placed under de facto house arrest since last year".

== Death ==
Jiang died of pneumonia on 11 March 2023, at the age of 91.

== Awards ==
In August 2004, Jiang was awarded the prestigious Ramon Magsaysay Award for Public Service. According to the board of trustees, "The Ramon Magsaysay Award Foundation recognizes his brave stand for truth in Mainland China, spurring life-saving measures to confront and contain the deadly threat of SARS".

On 20 September 2007, the New York Academy of Sciences gave Jiang the Heinz R. Pagels Human Rights of Scientists Award.

== See also ==
- Li Wenliang
