= Dongxihu, Wuhan =

Dongxihu 东西湖区
- District
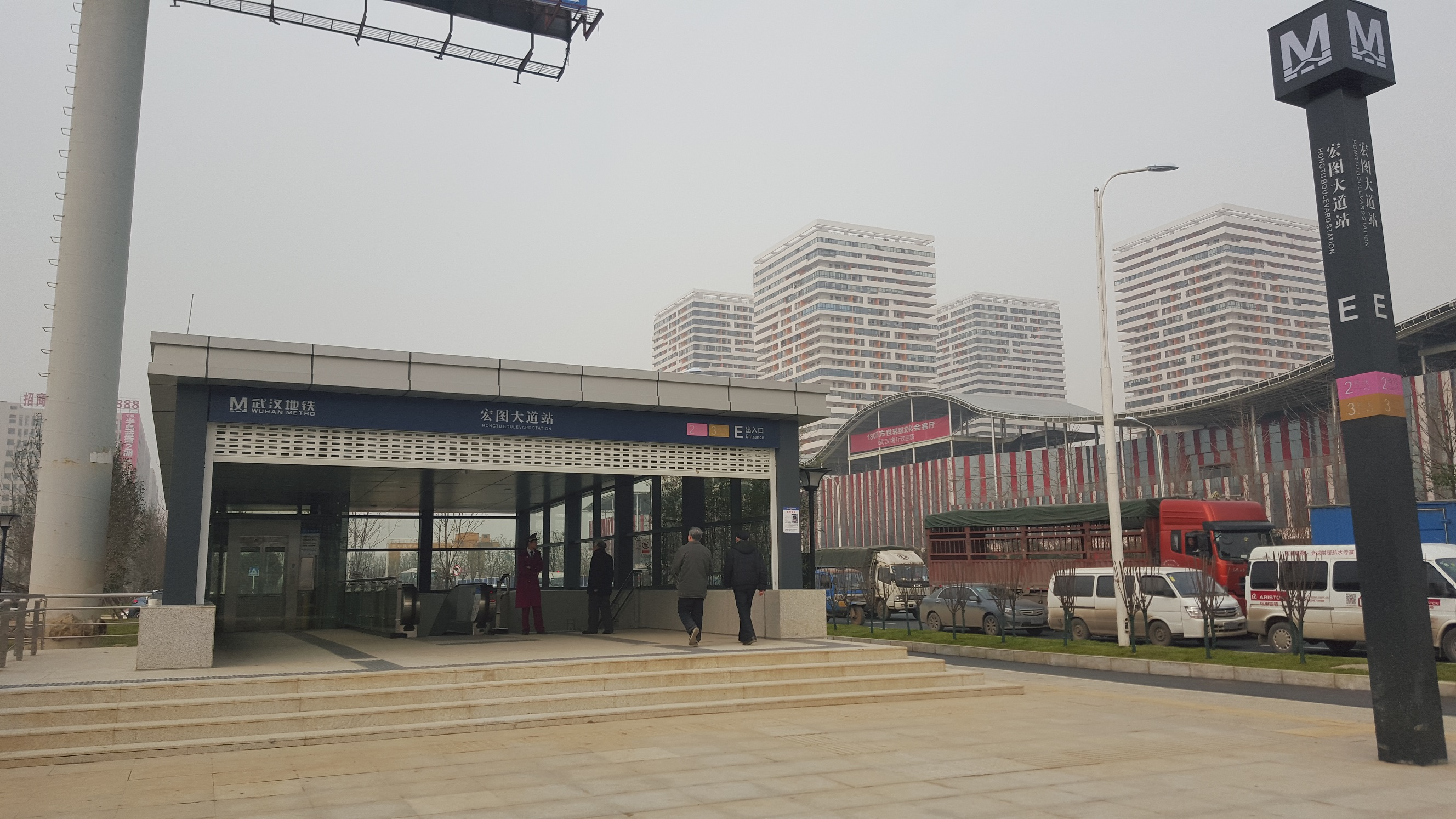
- Hongtu Boulevard Station
- Interactive map of Dongxihu
- Location in Hubei
- Coordinates: 30°37′27″N 114°08′45″E
- Country: People's Republic of China
- Province: Hubei
- Sub-provincial city: Wuhan
- Township-level (4th) subdivisions: 12

Area
  - Total: 439.19 km^{2} (169.57 sq mi)

Population (2020)
  - Total: 845,782
  - Density: 1,925.8/km^{2} (4,987.7/sq mi)
- Time zone: UTC+8 (China Standard)
- Website: http://www.dxh.gov.cn/

Dongxihu District (Chinese: 东西湖区; pinyin: Dōngxīhú Qū) is one of 13 urban districts of the prefecture-level city of Wuhan, the capital of Hubei Province, China, forming part of the city's western suburbs. It lies on the north (left) bank of the Han River. Along with Qiaokou, it is the only district of Wuhan to not have a Yangtze River shoreline; it borders the districts of Huangpi to the northeast, Jiang'an to the east, Jianghan, Qiaokou, and Hanyang to the southeast, and Caidian to the southwest. The district also borders the prefecture-level city of Xiaogan to the north and west.

== Geography ==
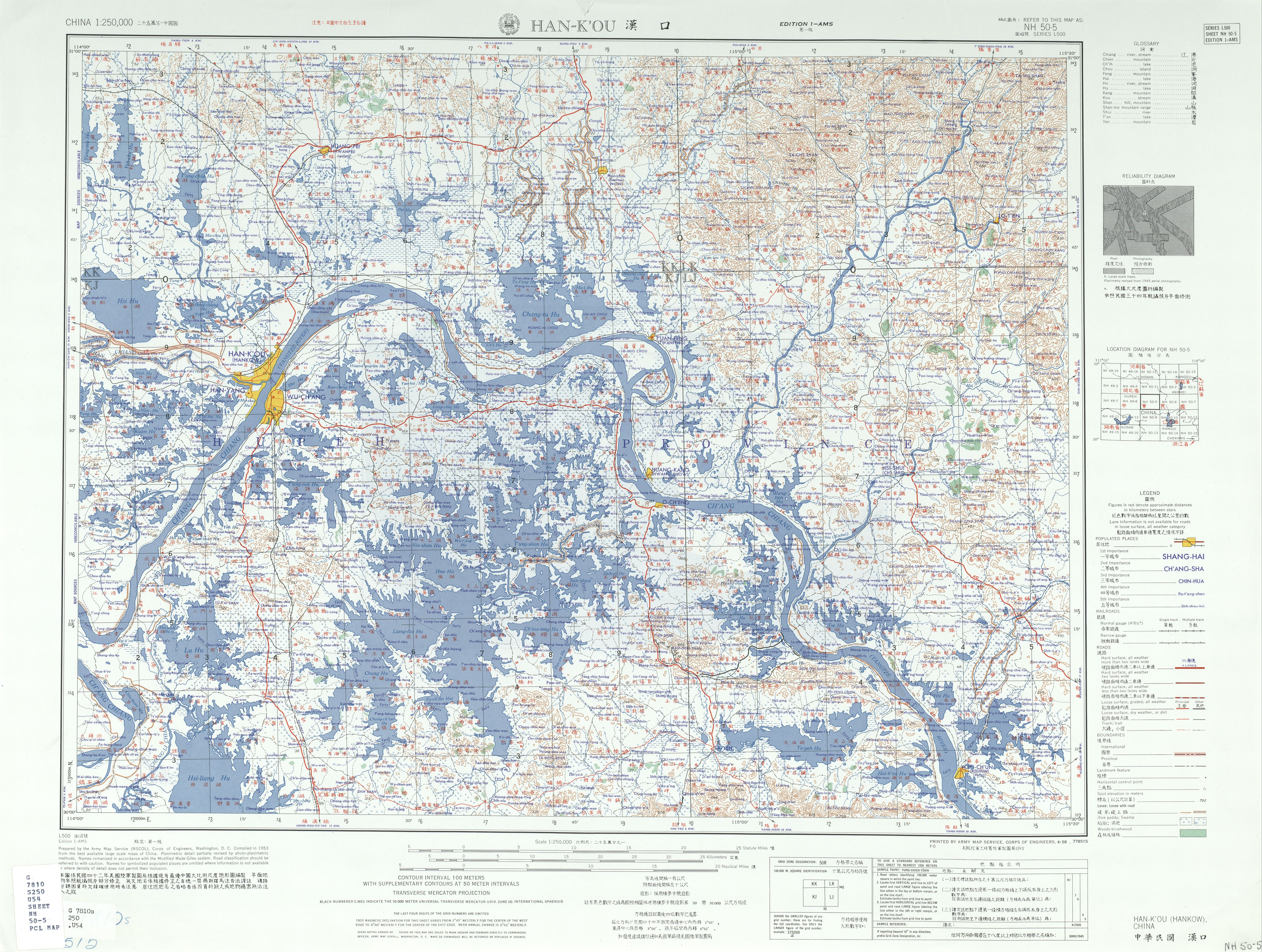
Map including East Lake (labeled as Tung Hu 東湖) and West Lake (labeled as Hsi Hu 西湖) as they were in 1953 (not to be confused with East Lake (Wuhan))

=== Administrative Divisions ===
Dongxihu District currently administers eight subdistricts, one administrative committee, and three local offices:

Name (with translation)	Chinese (S)	Hanyu Pinyin
Wujiashan Subdistrict (Wu Family Mountain)	吴家山街道	Wújiāshān Jiēdào
Jiangjunlu Subdistrict (General Road)	将军路街道	Jiāngjūnlù Jiēdào
Cihui Subdistrict (Compassionate Benevolence)	慈惠街道	Cíhuì Jiēdào
Zoumaling Subdistrict (Horse Riding Hill)	走马岭街道	Zǒumǎlǐng Jiēdào
Jinghe Subdistrict (Jing River)	径河街道	Jìnghé Jiēdào
Changqing Subdistrict (Long Youth)	长青街道	Chángqīng Jiēdào
Xingouzhen Subdistrict (New Channel Town)	新沟镇街道	Xīngōuzhèn Jiēdào
Jinyinhu Subdistrict (Gold and Silver Lake)	金银湖街道	Jīnyínhú Jiēdào
Changqinghuayuan New Area Administrative Committee (Evergreen Park)	常青花园新区管委会	Chángqīnghuāyuán Xīnqū Guǎnwěihuì
Baiquan/Boquan Office (Cedar Spring)	柏泉办事处	Bǎiquán Bànshìchù
Xin'andu Office (Xin'an Ferry)	辛安渡办事处	Xīn'āndù Bànshìchù
Dongshan Township (East Mountain)	东山办事处	Dōngshān Bànshìchù

== Transportation ==
Wuhan Metro Line 1 have 5 stations in Dongxihu District.

Wuhan Metro Line 2 passes through Dongxihu District. There are 4 stations of Line 2 in Dongxihu District: Hongtu Boulevard station, Changqingcheng station, Jinyintan station and Changqing Huayuan station.

The northern end of Line 6 runs in Dongxihu District. There are 10 stations of Line 6 in Dongxihu District: Xincheng 11th Road station, Matoutan Park station, Five Rings Sports Center station, Erya Road station, Haikou 3rd Road station, Jinyinhu Park station, Jinyinhu station, Garden Expo North station, Polytechnic University station and Changqing Huayuan station.
