= Wuhu station =

Wuhu station can refer to:

- Wuhu railway station, a railway station in Wuhu, China
- Wuhu station (Wuhan Metro), a metro station in Wuhan, China
