= Qinglong station =

Metro station in Wuhan, China

Qinglong 青龙
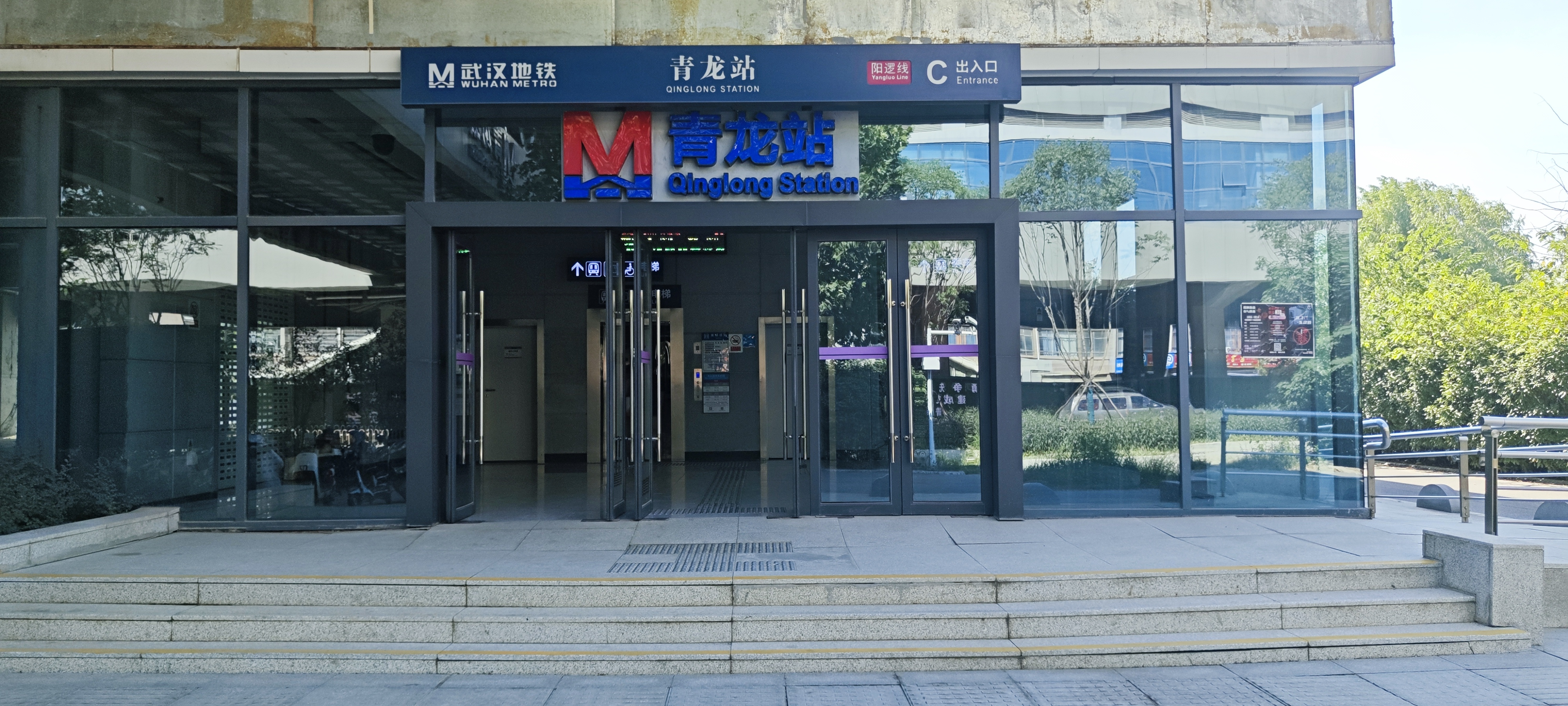
- Entrance C

General information
- Location: Huangpi District, Wuhan, Hubei; China
- Coordinates: 30.70735°N 114.38479°E
- Operator: Wuhan Metro Co., Ltd
- Line: Yangluo Line
- Platforms: 2 (2 side platforms)

Construction
- Structure type: Elevated

History
- Opened: December 26, 2017 (Yangluo Line)

Services
Preceding station	Wuhan Metro	Following station
Shenjiaji towards Zhongyi Road	Yangluo Line	Gaoche towards Jintai
Location

Qinglong Station (Chinese: 青龙站) is a station on the Yangluo Line of the Wuhan Metro. It entered the revenue service on December 26, 2017. It is located in Huangpi District.

== Station layout ==
3F	Side platform, doors will open on the right
3F	Westbound	← Yangluo Line towards Zhongyi Road (Shenjiaji)
3F	Eastbound	Yangluo Line towards Jintai (Gaoche) →
3F	Side platform, doors will open on the right
2F	Concourse	Faregates, Station Agent
G	Entrances and Exits
