= Wuhu station (Wuhan Metro) =

Metro station in Wuhan, China

Wuhu 武湖 metro
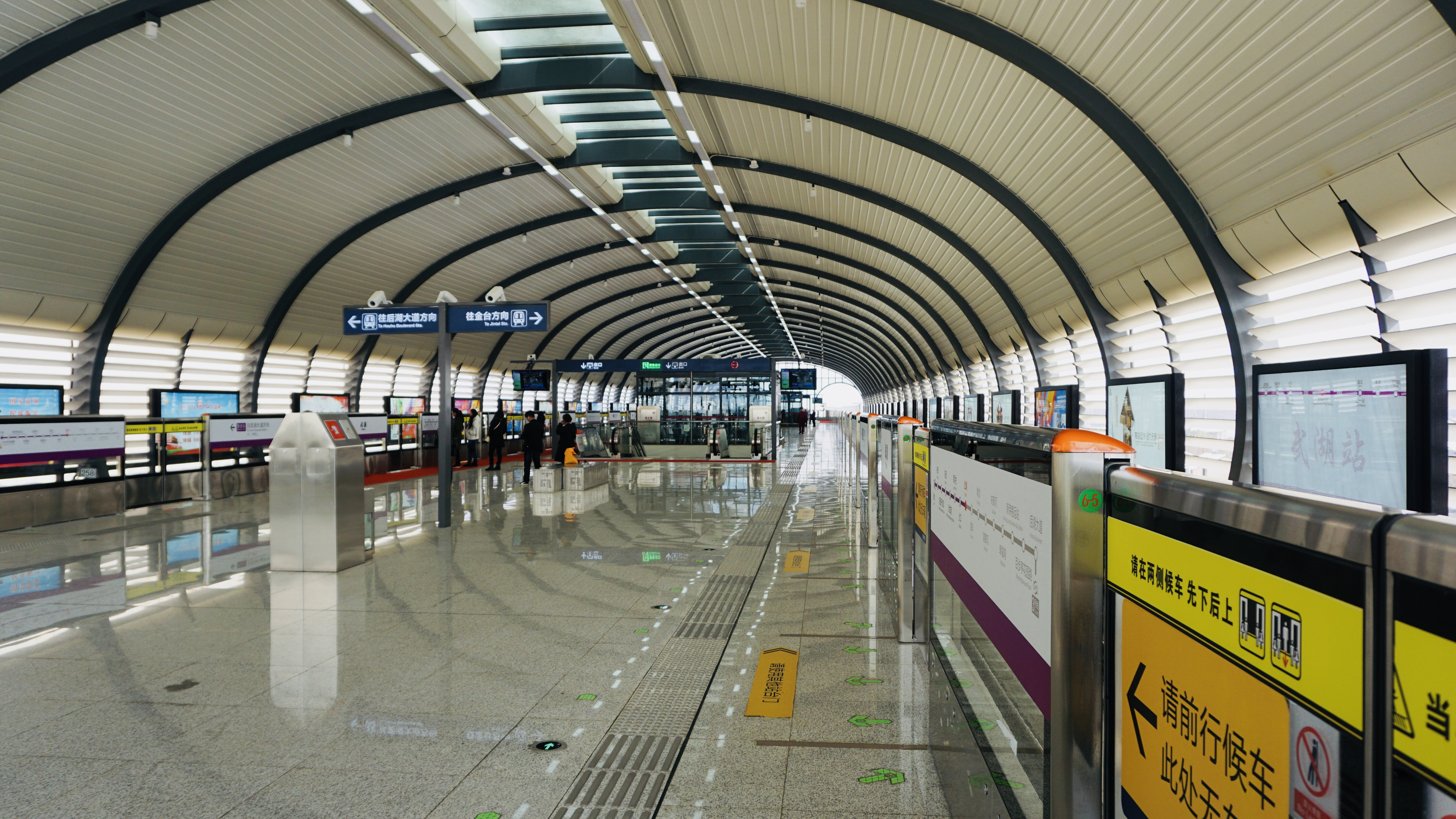

General information
- Location: Huangpi District, Wuhan, Hubei; China
- Coordinates: 30.7092°N 114.4243°E
- Operator: Wuhan Metro Co., Ltd
- Line: Yangluo Line
- Platforms: 2 (1 island platform)

Construction
- Structure type: Elevated

History
- Opened: December 26, 2017 (Yangluo Line)

Services
Preceding station	Wuhan Metro	Following station
Gaoche towards Zhongyi Road	Yangluo Line	Shakou towards Jintai
Location

Wuhu station (Chinese: 武湖站) is a station on the Yangluo Line of the Wuhan Metro. It entered revenue service on December 26, 2017. It is located in Huangpi District.

== Station layout ==
3F	Westbound	← Yangluo Line towards Zhongyi Road (Gaoche)
3F	Island platform, doors will open on the left
3F	Eastbound	Yangluo Line towards Jintai (Shakou) →
2F	Concourse	Faregates, Station Agent
G	Entrances and Exits
