= Dijiao station =

Wuhan Metro station

Dijiao 堤角 metro
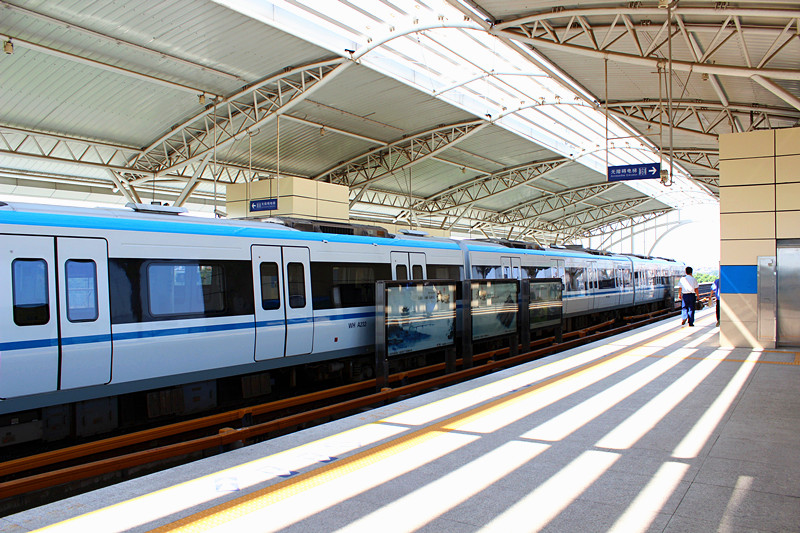
- Dijiao Station viewed from its northbound platform.

General information
- Location: Jiang'an District, Wuhan, Hubei; China
- Coordinates: 30°40′02″N 114°20′19″E
- Operated by: Wuhan Metro Co., Ltd
- Line: Line 1
- Platforms: 2 (2 side platforms)

Other information
- Station code: 104

History
- Opened: July 29, 2010; 15 years ago

Services
| Preceding station | Wuhan Metro | Following station |
|---|---|---|
| Xinrong towards Jinghe | Line 1 | Tengzigang towards Hankou North |
Location

Dijiao (Chinese: 堤角站) is a station of Line 1 of the Wuhan Metro, opened along with the completion of Line 1 (Phase 2) on July 29, 2010. It is an elevated station situated on Jiefang Avenue, with easy access to Dijiao Park and bus transfers to Hankou North. The station has two side platforms. Trains terminating at Dijiao Station uses a single crossover to access the westbound platform. The eastbound platform has entered fared service for Line 1's Hankou North extension on July 28, 2014.

== Station layout ==
Dijiao Station is a three-story elevated station built entirely along Jiefang Avenue.

| 3F | Side platform, doors open on the right |
| 3F | Westbound | ← Line 1 to Jinghe (Xinrong) |
| 3F | Eastbound | Line 1 to Hankou North (Tengzigang) → |
| 3F | Side platform, doors open on the right |
| 2F | Concourse | Faregates, Station Agent |
| G | Entrances and Exits | Exits A, B |

== Exits ==
There are currently two exits in service.

- Exit A: Northwest side of Jiefang Avenue
- Exit B: Southeast side of Jiefang Avenue. Accessible to Dijiao Park.

== Transfers ==
Dijiao station is adjacent to Dijiao Bus Depot. Bus transfers to Route 3, 211, 212, 234, 509, 592, and 623 are available.
