= Tengzigang station =

Wuhan Metro station

Tengzigang 滕子岗 metro
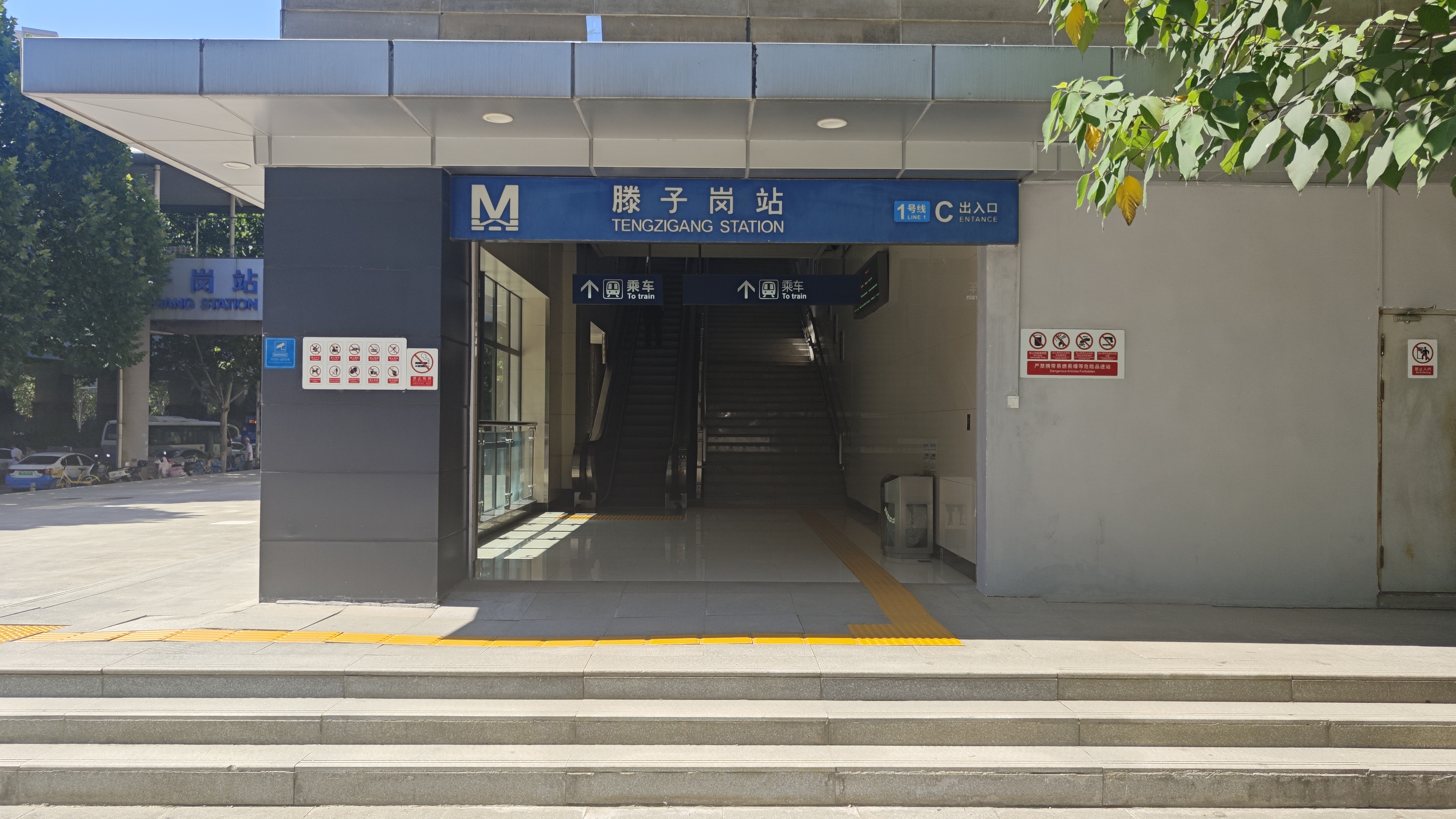
- Entrance C

General information
- Location: Jiang'an District, Wuhan, Hubei; China
- Operated by: Wuhan Metro Co., Ltd
- Line: Line 1
- Platforms: 2 (2 side platforms)

Construction
- Structure type: Elevated

Other information
- Station code: 103

History
- Opened: May 28, 2014; 12 years ago (Line 1)

Services
Preceding station	Wuhan Metro	Following station
Dijiao towards Jinghe	Line 1	Shekouxincheng towards Hankou North
Location

Tengzigang Station (Chinese: 滕子岗站) is a station of Line 1 of Wuhan Metro. It entered revenue service on May 28, 2014. It is located in Jiang'an District.

== Station layout ==
3F	Side platform, doors open on the right
3F	Westbound	← Line 1 towards Jinghe (Dijiao)
3F	Eastbound	Line 1 towards Hankou North (Shekouxincheng) →
3F	Side platform, doors open on the right
2F	Concourse	Faregates, Station Agent
G	Entrances and Exits
