= Yangjiawan station =

Wuhan Metro station

Yangjiawan 杨家湾 metro
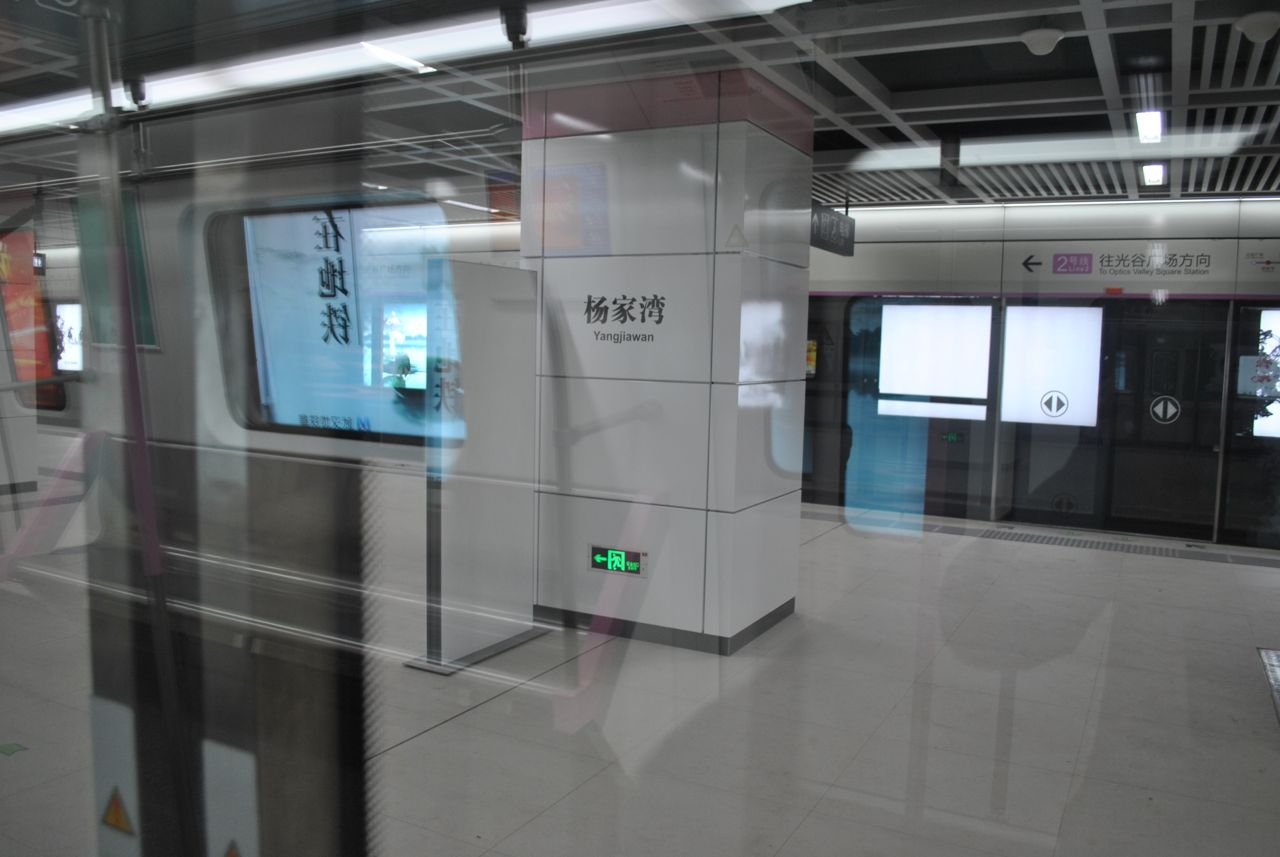

General information
- Location: Donghu NTDZ District, Wuhan, Hubei; China
- Coordinates: 30°30′27″N 114°22′39″E
- Operated by: Wuhan Metro Co., Ltd
- Line: Line 2
- Platforms: 2 (1 island platform)

Construction
- Structure type: Underground

History
- Opened: December 28, 2012 (Line 2)

Services
Preceding station	Wuhan Metro	Following station
Huquan towards Tianhe International Airport	Line 2	Optics Valley Square towards Fozuling
Location

Yangjiawan Station (Chinese: 杨家湾站) is a station of Line 2 of Wuhan Metro. It entered revenue service on December 28, 2012. It is located in Donghu New Technology Development Zone.

The previous name is Mingdu Garden Station.

== Station layout ==
G	Entrances and Exits	Exits A-D
B1	Concourse	Faregates, Station Agent
B2	Northbound	← Line 2 towards Tianhe International Airport (Huquan)
B2	Island platform, doors will open on the left
B2	Southbound	Line 2 towards Fozuling (Optics Valley Square) →

== Gallery ==
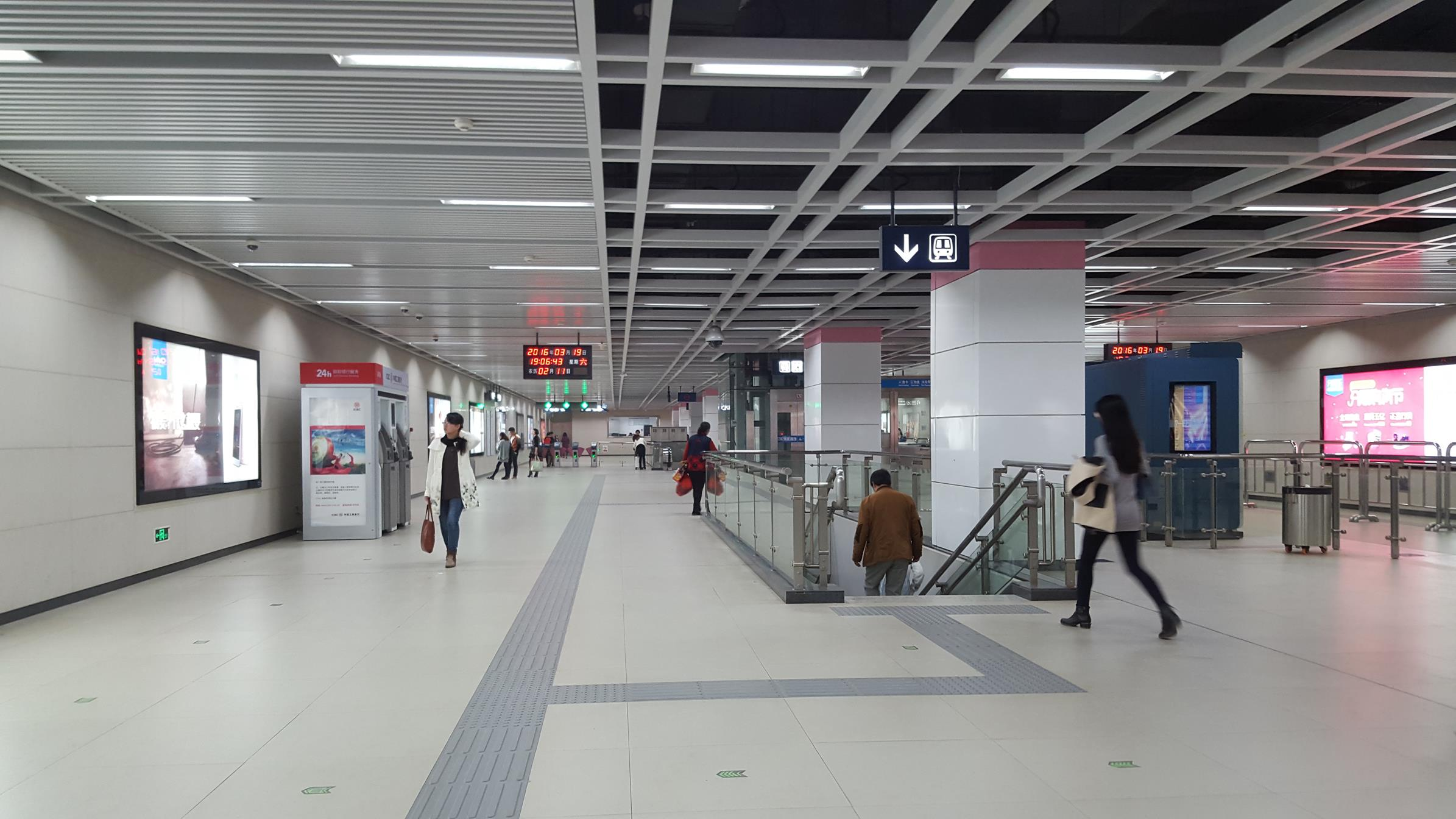
Concourse

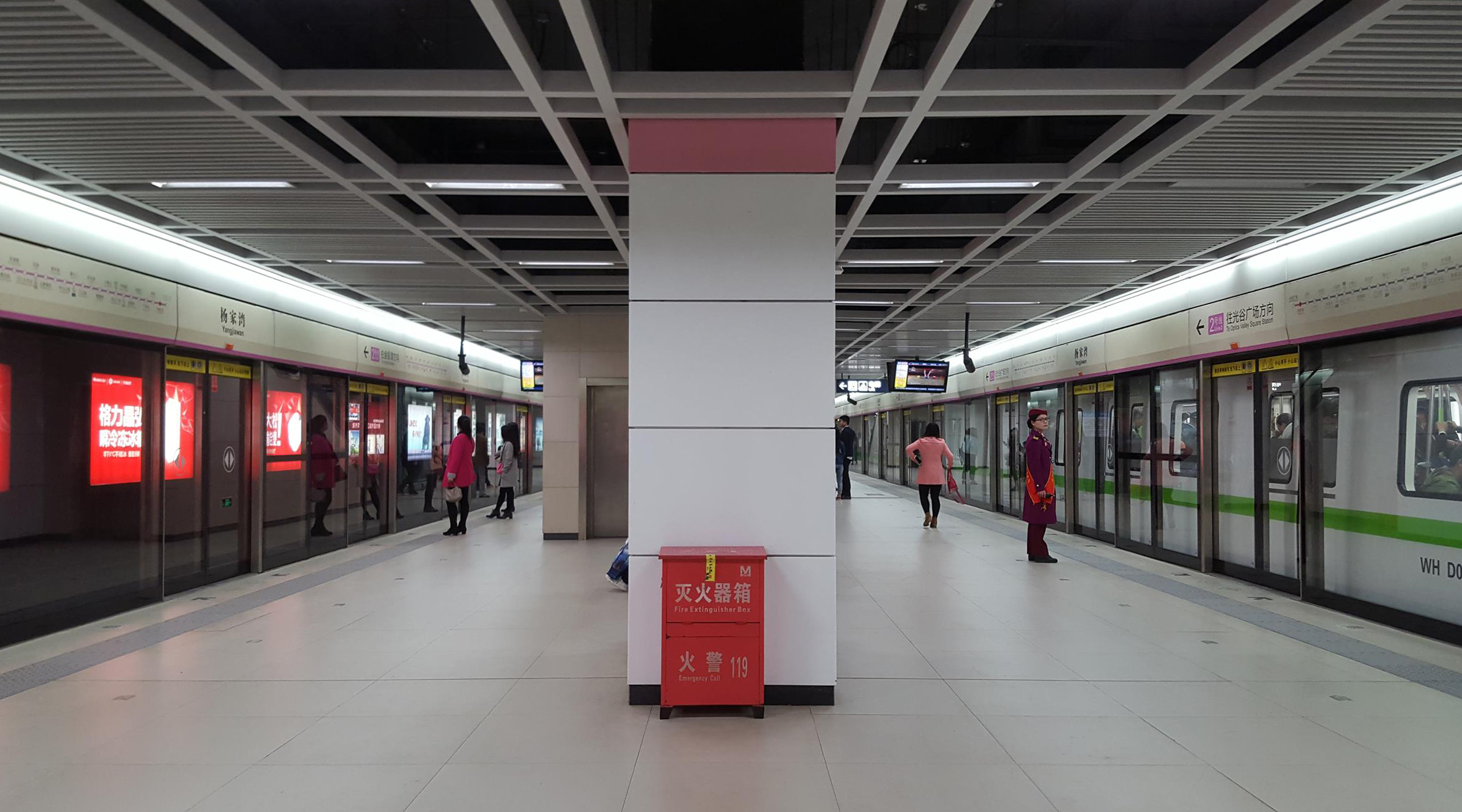
Platform
