= Guanshan Subdistrict =

Subdistrict in Wuhan, Hubei, China

Guanshan Subdistrict 关山街道
- Subdistrict
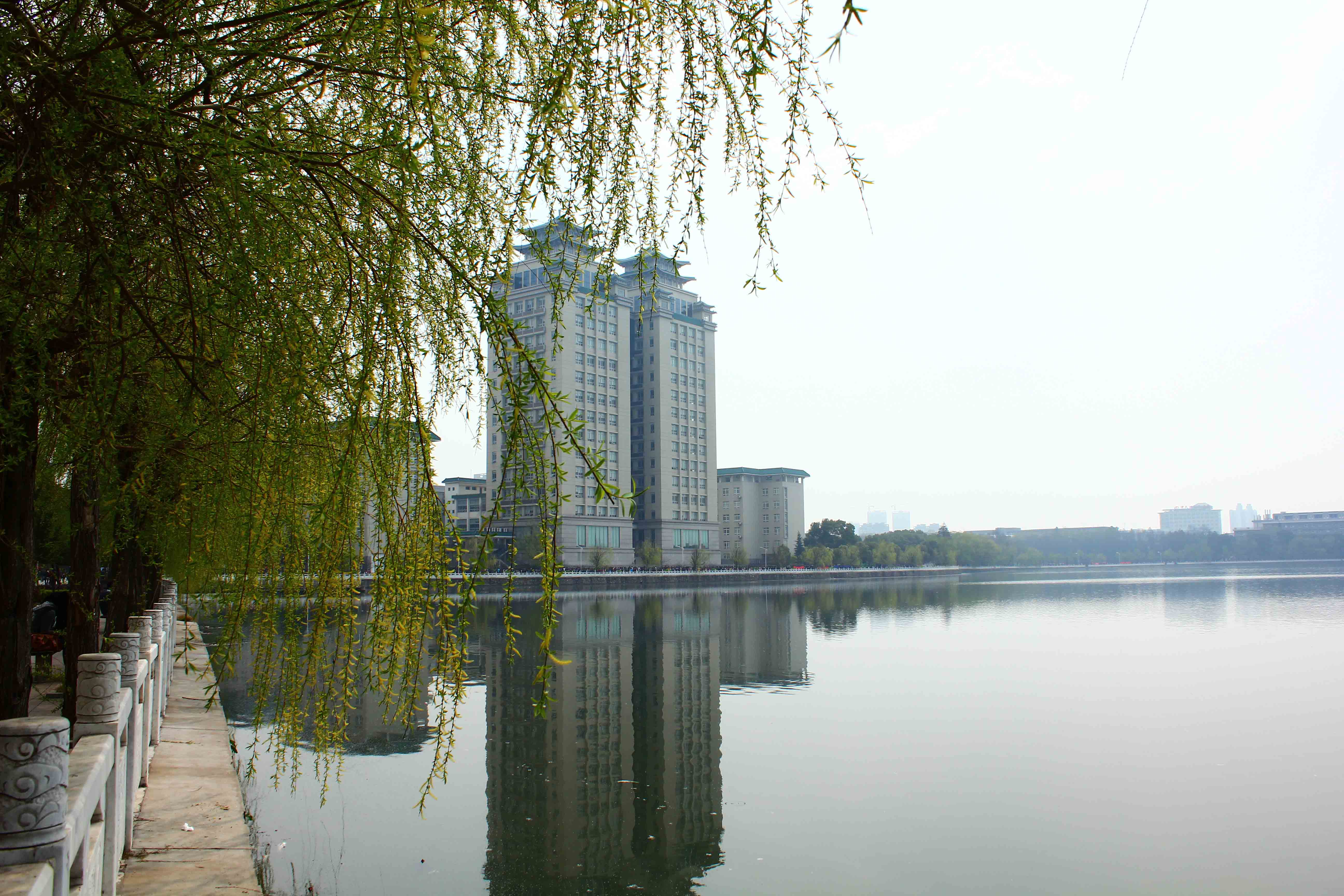
- The library of the South Central University for Nationalities on the Shore of South Lake

- Location in Hubei
- Coordinates: 30°30′27″N 114°24′35″E
- Country: People's Republic of China
- Province: Hubei
- Sub-provincial city: Wuhan
- District: Hongshan
- Village-level divisions: 28 residential communities
- Established: August 1958

Area
  - Total: 15.5 km^{2} (6.0 sq mi)

Population (2010)
  - Total: 314,096
- Time zone: UTC+8 (China Standard)

Guanshan Subdistrict
- Simplified Chinese: 关山街道
- Traditional Chinese: 關山街道
Transcriptions
Standard Mandarin
- Hanyu Pinyin: Guānshān Jiēdào

Guanshan Subdistrict (Chinese: 关山街道; pinyin: Guānshān Jiēdào) is a subdistrict in Hongshan District, Wuhan, Hubei, China. To the east it borders the Donghu New Technology Development Zone; to the south it borders Jiangxia District and the Third Ring Road; to the west it borders Zhuodaoquan Subdistrict (卓刀泉街道); to the north it borders the East Lake Nature Scenic Area. The subdistrict encompasses the campuses of more than ten universities including Huazhong University of Science and Technology, China University of Geosciences, South Central University for Nationalities, Zhongnan University of Economics and Law, and Wuhan Textile University (武汉纺织大学).

== History ==
Guanshan People's Commune (the forebear of Guanshan Subdistrict) was established in August 1958.

In March 1961, Guanshan People's Commune and Hongshan District People's Commune were combined into Hongshan District.

From June 1963, Hongshan District included Guanshan Subdistrict.

In August 1964, Guanshan Subdistrict was transferred from Hongshan District to Wuchang District.

In July 1986, Guanshan Subdistrict was transferred from Wuchang District to Hongshan District.

In 2004, Moshan Residential Community (磨山社区) was transferred from Guanshan Subdistrict to East Lake Scenic Area Subdistrict.

In November 2010, eight residential communities (Qilingjiusuo (七零九所社区), Hongxing (红星社区), Wujiawan (吴家湾社区), Huachengyuan (华城苑社区), Luguang (鲁广社区), Gongchengda (工程大社区), Guanxi (关西社区), and Guanxi'er (关西二社区)) were transferred into the newly-created Zhuodaoquan Subdistrict.

== Administrative divisions ==
Guanshan Subdistrict administers twenty-eight residential communities:

- Haihe (海核社区), Nanwang (南望社区), Youkeyuan (邮科院社区- FiberHome Technologies Group 武汉邮电科学研究院 (烽火科技集团)), Hudian (湖电社区), Qibiao (汽标社区), Zhongnan Caijing Zhengfa Daxue Nanhu (中南财经政法大学南湖社区), Zisong (紫菘社区), Minda (民大社区- South Central University for Nationalities), Fangda (纺大社区- Wuhan Textile University (武汉纺织大学)), Guanshankou (关山口社区), Qifa (汽发社区), Yangguang (阳光社区), Yijinghuating (逸景华庭社区), Guannan (关南社区), Lumolu (鲁磨路社区), Changjiang (长江社区), Dida (地大社区- China University of Geosciences), Long'an (龙安社区), Kangjuyuan (康居园社区), Bishui (碧水社区), Geguang (葛光社区), Xuefu (学府社区), Jianqiaochuntian (剑桥春天社区), Baoli (保利社区), Zhihuicheng (智慧城社区), Fenglinshangcheng (枫林上城社区), Yangchun (阳春社区), Huazhong Keji Daxue (华中科技大学社区- Huazhong University of Science and Technology)

== Demographics ==
Historical population
Year	Pop.	±% p.a.
2000	195,732	—
2010	314,096	+4.84%

As of 1996, the total area of Guanshan Subdistrict was 35 km^{2} (14 sq mi). After the creation of Zhuodaoquan Subdistrict in late 2010 and other changes, the total population and area of Guanshan Subdistrict was reduced. The population figures from the Fifth National Population Census of the People's Republic of China in 2000 and the Sixth National Population Census of the People's Republic of China in 2010 include areas that are no longer part of present-day Guanshan Subdistrict. In 2016, 1,905 babies were born in Guanshan Subdistrict with 99.21% of these births in compliance with the child planning policies of China.

== Transportation ==
Guanshan Subdistrict is served by Optics Valley Square station on Line 2 (Wuhan Metro). The Third Ring Road forms the southern limit of Guanshan Subdistrict.
