= Huquan station =

Wuhan Metro station

Huquan 虎泉 metro
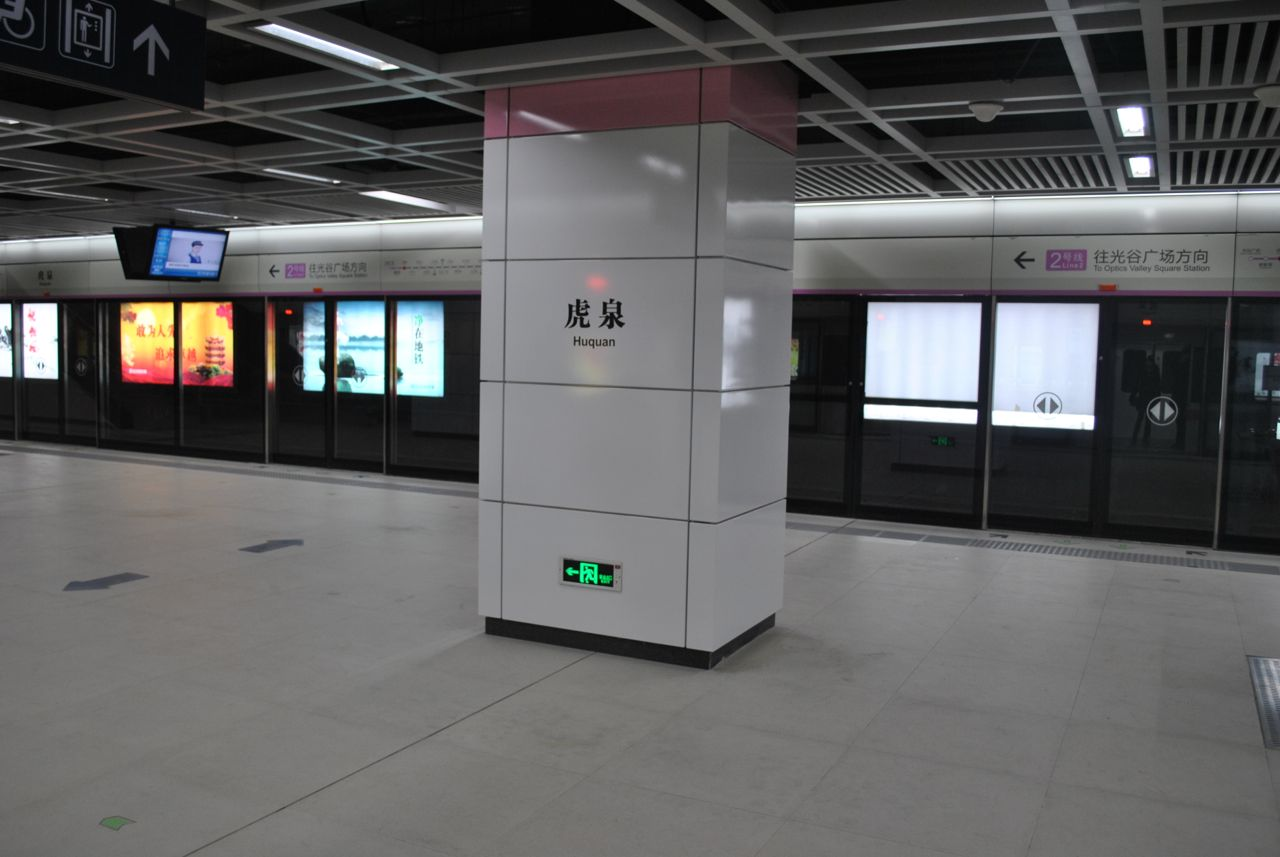

General information
- Location: Donghu NTDZ District, Wuhan, Hubei; China
- Coordinates: 30°30′52″N 114°21′54″E
- Operated by: Wuhan Metro Co., Ltd
- Lines: Line 2 Line 11
- Platforms: 2 (1 island platform)

Construction
- Structure type: Underground

History
- Opened: December 28, 2012 (Line 2); December 27, 2024 (Line 11)

Services
Preceding station	Wuhan Metro	Following station
Guangbutun towards Tianhe International Airport	Line 2	Yangjiawan towards Fozuling
Mafangshan towards Jiang'an Road	Line 11	Wuhan Sports University towards Gediannan Railway Station
Location

Huquan Station (Chinese: 虎泉站) is a station of Line 2 and Line 11 of Wuhan Metro. It entered revenue service on December 28, 2012. It is located in Donghu New Technology Development Zone.

== Station layout ==
G	Entrances and Exits	Exits A, B, D
B1	Concourse	Faregates, Station Agent
B2	Northbound	← Line 2 towards Tianhe International Airport (Guangbutun)
B2	Island platform, doors will open on the left
B2	Southbound	Line 2 towards Fozuling (Yangjiawan) →

== Gallery ==
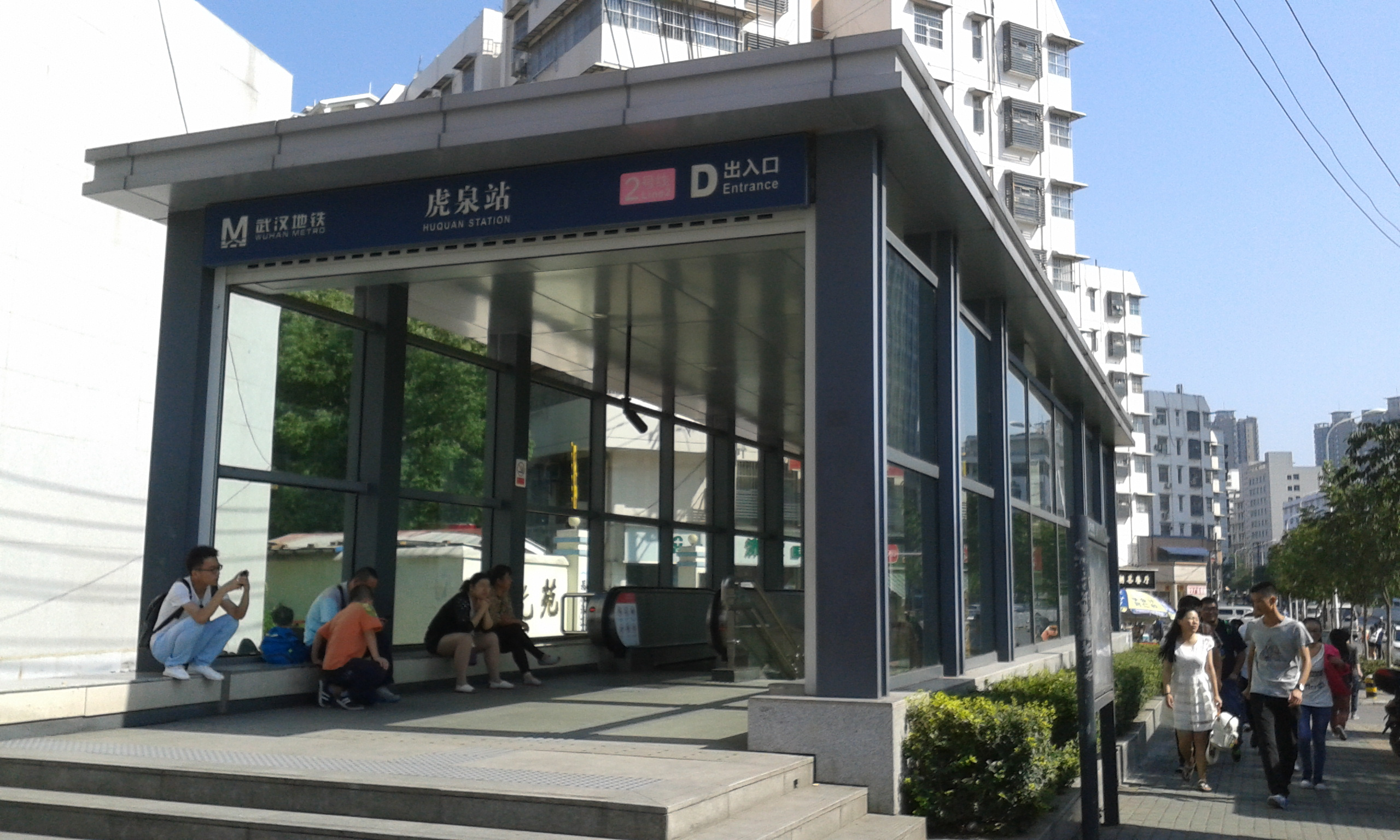
Entrance D
