= Huazhong University of Science and Technology station =

Wuhan Metro station

Coordinates: 30°30′35″N 114°24′34″E

Huazhong University of Science and Technology 华中科技大学

General information
- Location: Hongshan District, Wuhan, Hubei; China
- Operated by: Wuhan Metro Co., Ltd
- Line: Line 2
- Platforms: 2 (1 island platform)

Construction
- Structure type: Underground

History
- Opened: February 19, 2019 (Line 2)

Services
Preceding station	Wuhan Metro	Following station
Luoxiong Road towards Tianhe International Airport	Line 2	Guanggu Boulevard towards Fozuling
Location

Huazhong University of Science and Technology Station (Chinese: 华中科技大学站) is a station on Line 2 of Wuhan Metro. It entered revenue service on February 19, 2019. It is located in Hongshan District and it serves the Huazhong University of Science and Technology.

== Station layout ==
G	Entrances and Exits
B1	Concourse	Faregates, Station Agent
B2	Northbound	← Line 2 towards Tianhe International Airport (Luoxiong Road)
B2	Island platform, doors will open on the left
B2	Southbound	Line 2 towards Fozuling (Guanggu Boulevard) →
