= Luoxiong Road station =

Wuhan Metro station

Luoxiong Road 珞雄路 metro
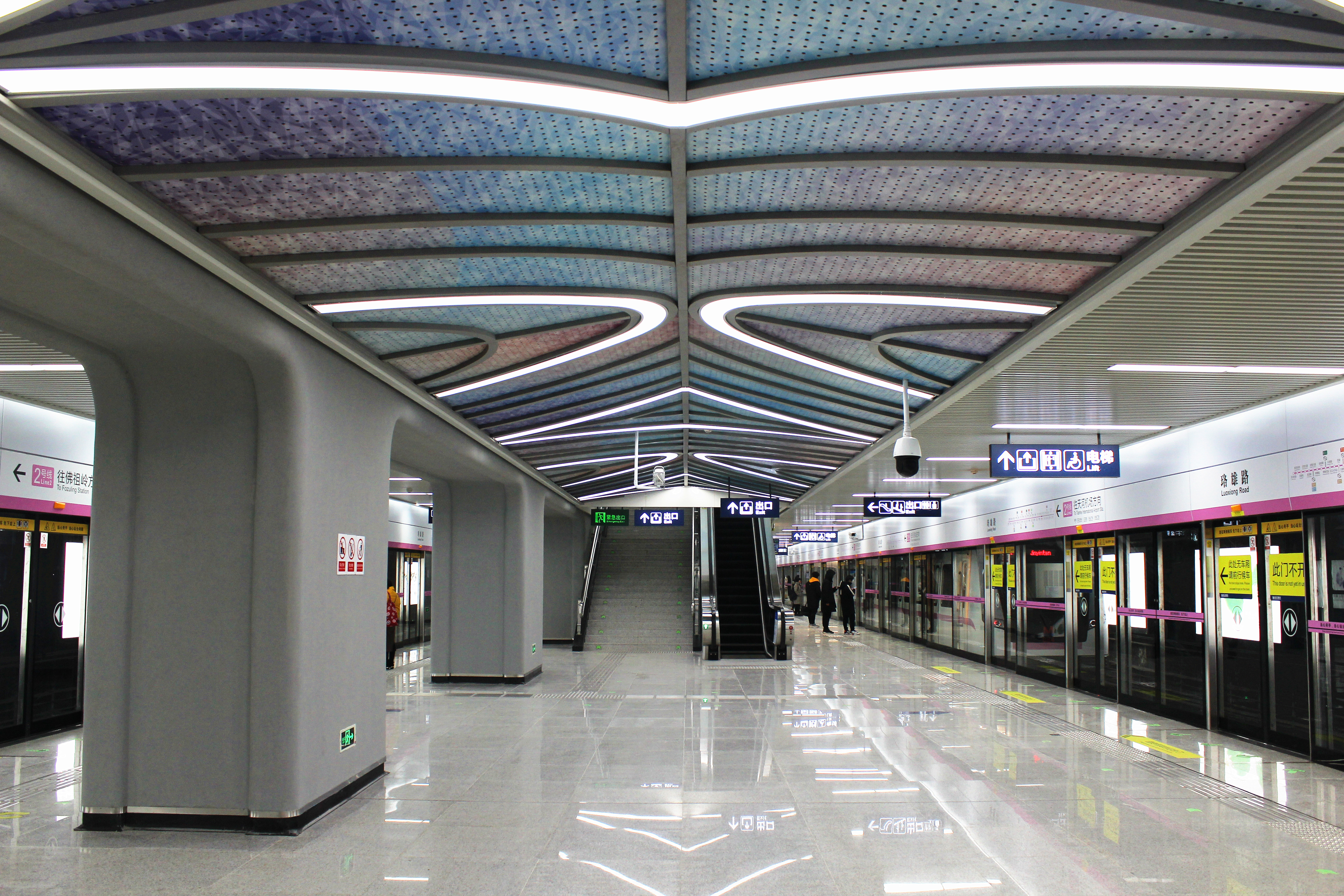

General information
- Location: Hongshan District, Wuhan, Hubei; China
- Operated by: Wuhan Metro Co., Ltd
- Line: Line 2
- Platforms: 2 (1 island platform)

Construction
- Structure type: Underground

History
- Opened: February 19, 2019 (Line 2)

Services
Preceding station	Wuhan Metro	Following station
Optics Valley Square towards Tianhe International Airport	Line 2	Huazhong University of Science and Technology towards Fozuling
Location

Luoxiong Road Station (Chinese: 珞雄路站) is a station on Line 2 of Wuhan Metro. It entered revenue service on February 19, 2019. It is located in Hongshan District.

== Station layout ==
G	Entrances and Exits	Exits A-E
B1		Transfer Corridor
B2	Concourse	Faregates, Station Agent
B3	Northbound	← Line 2 towards Tianhe International Airport (Optics Valley Square)
B3	Island platform, doors will open on the left
B3	Southbound	Line 2 towards Fozuling (Huazhong University of Science and Technology) →

== Gallery ==
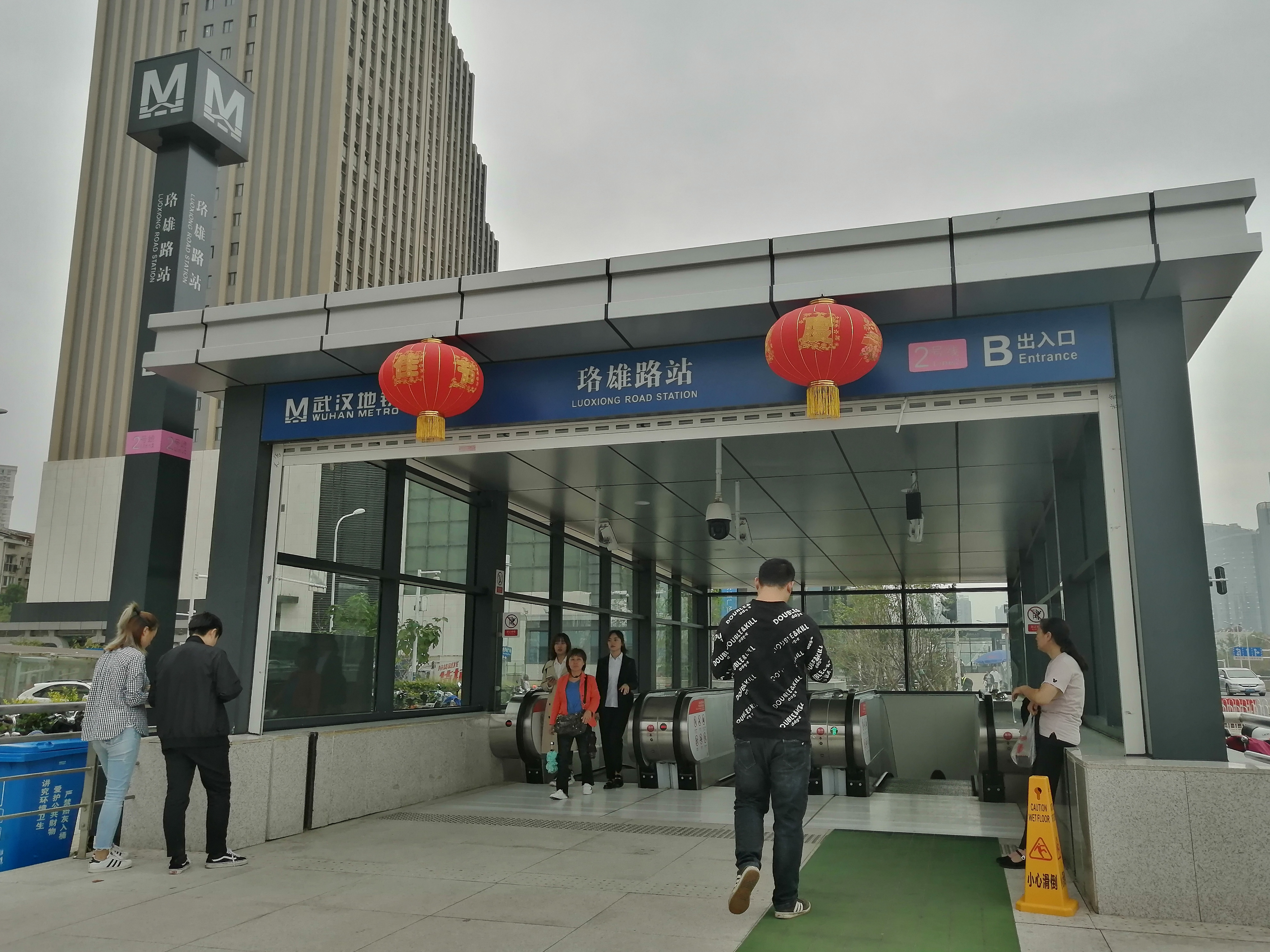
Entrance B

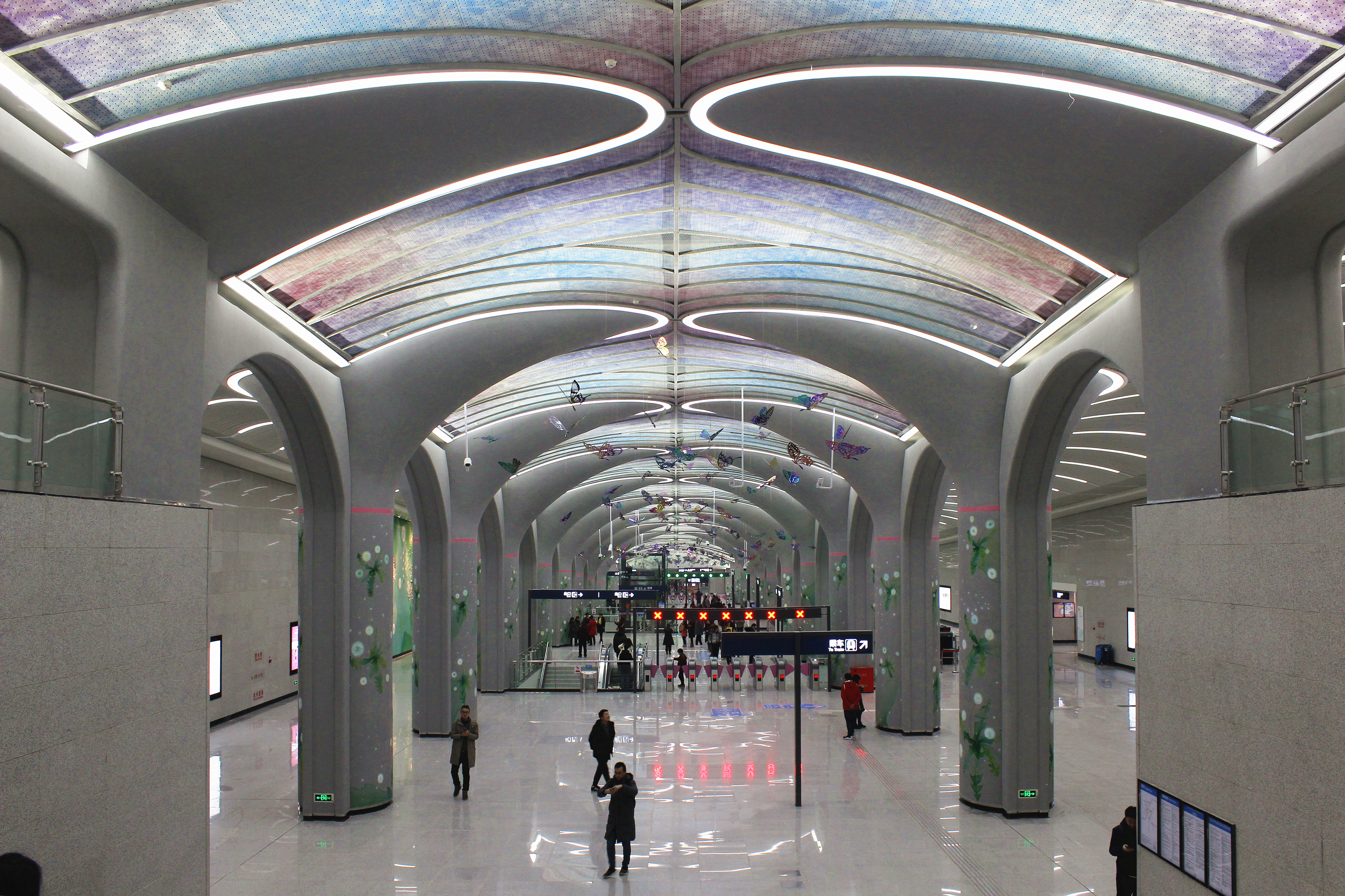
Concourse
