= Xiuhu station =

Wuhan Metro station

Coordinates: 30.4506°N 114.4154°E

Xiuhu 秀湖 metro

General information
- Location: Jiangxia District, Wuhan, Hubei; China
- Operated by: Wuhan Metro Co., Ltd
- Line: Line 2
- Platforms: 2 (1 island platform)

Construction
- Structure type: Underground

History
- Opened: February 19, 2019 (Line 2)

Services
Preceding station	Wuhan Metro	Following station
Jinronggang North towards Tianhe International Airport	Line 2	Canglong East Street towards Fozuling
Location

Xiuhu Station (Chinese: 秀湖站) is a station on Line 2 of Wuhan Metro. It entered revenue service on February 19, 2019. It is located in Jiangxia District.

== Station layout ==
G	Entrances and Exits	Exits A-D
B1	Concourse	Faregates, Station Agent
B2	Northbound	← Line 2 towards Tianhe International Airport (Jinronggang North)
B2	Island platform, doors will open on the left
B2	Southbound	Line 2 towards Fozuling (Canglong East Street) →
