= Guanggu Boulevard station =

Wuhan Metro station

Coordinates: 30.5088°N 114.4183°E

Guanggu Boulevard 光谷大道 metro
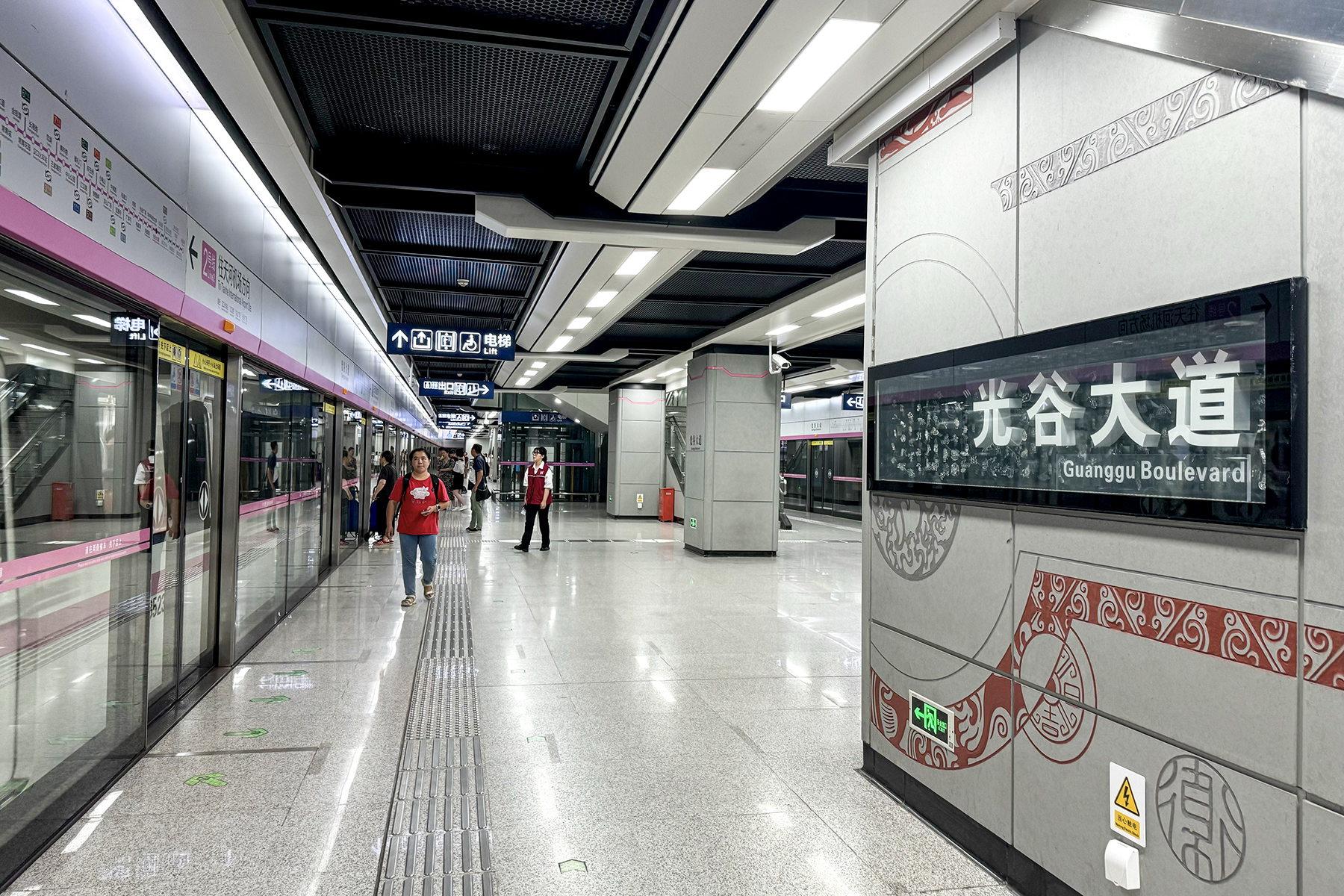

General information
- Location: Hongshan District, Wuhan, Hubei; China
- Operated by: Wuhan Metro Co., Ltd
- Line: Line 2
- Platforms: 2 (1 island platform)

Construction
- Structure type: Underground

History
- Opened: February 19, 2019 (Line 2)

Services
Preceding station	Wuhan Metro	Following station
Huazhong University of Science and Technology towards Tianhe International Airport	Line 2	Jiayuan Road towards Fozuling
Location

Guanggu Boulevard Station (Chinese: 光谷大道站) is a station on Line 2 of Wuhan Metro. It entered revenue service on February 19, 2019. It is located in Hongshan District.

== Station layout ==
G	Entrances and Exits
B1	Concourse	Faregates, Station Agent
B2	Northbound	← Line 2 towards Tianhe International Airport (Huazhong University of Science and Technology)
B2	Island platform, doors will open on the left
B2	Southbound	Line 2 towards Fozuling (Jiayuan Road) →
