= Huagong Tech =

Chinese technology company

Huagong Tech Company Limited
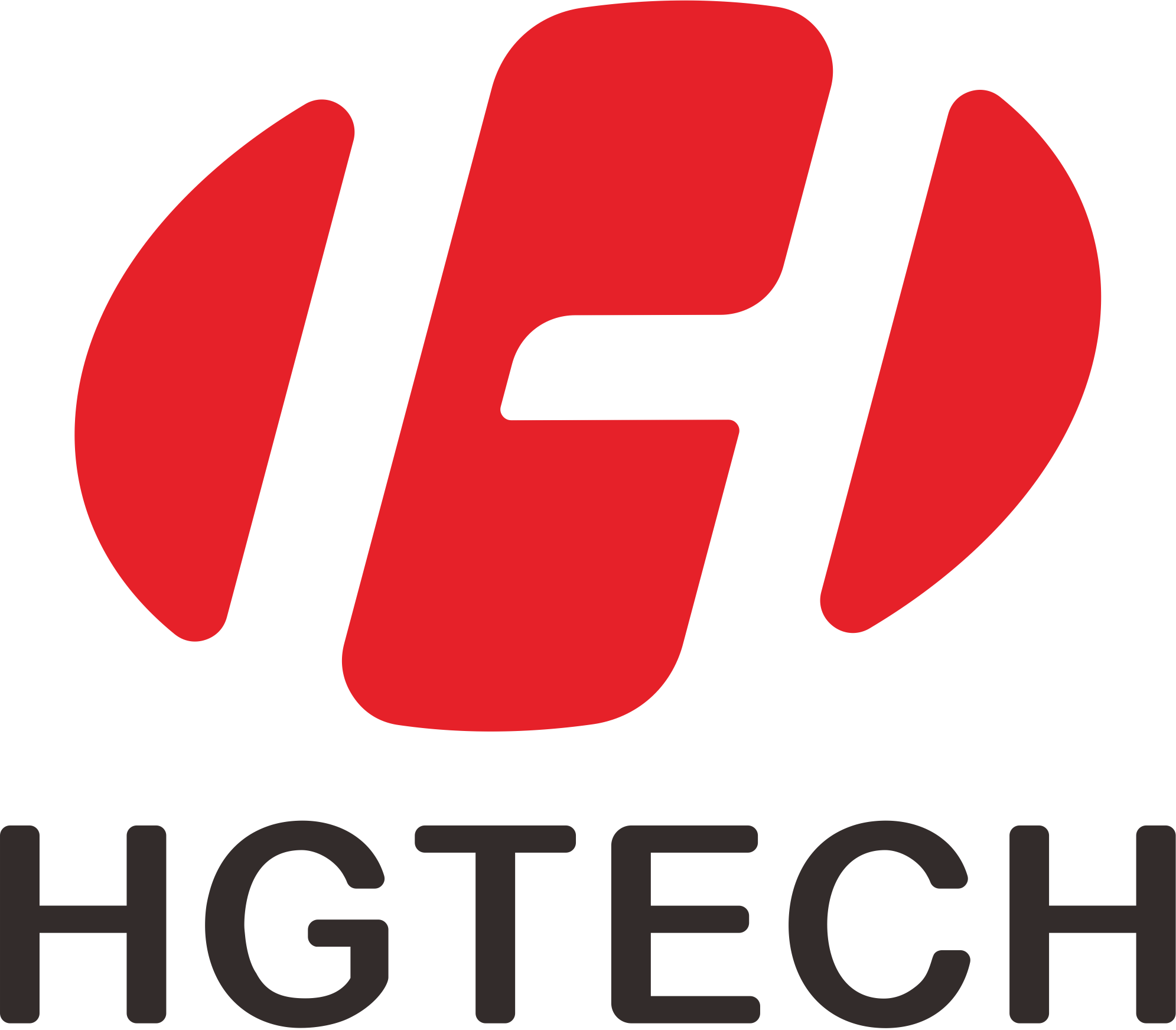
- Trade name: HGTECH
- Native name: 华工科技产业股份有限公司
- Type: Public; State-owned enterprise
- Traded as: SZSE: 000988; CSI A500
- Industry: Industrial laser equipment Optoelectronics
- Founded: 28 July 1999; 27 years ago
- Headquarters: Wuhan, Hubei, China
- Key people: Ma Xinqiang (Chairman & President)
- Revenue: ▼CN¥10.21 billion (2023)
- Net income: ▲CN¥998.59 million (2023)
- Total assets: ▲CN¥17.41 billion (2023)
- Total equity: ▲CN¥9.18 billion (2023)
- Owner: SASAC
- Number of employees: 8,179 (2023)
- Website: www.hgtech.com.cn

Huagong Tech (HGTECH; Chinese: 华工科技; pinyin: Huágōng Kējì) is a locally state-owned publicly listed Chinese company. It focuses in the field of industrial laser equipment and optoelectronics.

== Background ==
The origins of HGTECH can be traced to 1971 when Huazhong University of Science and Technology (HUST) established laboratories and research centres that focused on laser technology. In 1999 they were later restructured into a commercial entity named HGTECH which was based in Donghu New Technology Development Zone to commercialise the university's laser technology.

On 10 May 2000, HGTECH held its initial public offering becoming a listed company on the Shenzhen Stock Exchange. In the same year, HGTECH acquired Australian laser cutting equipment provider Farley Laserlab and took over its worldwide marketing network. This helped the company to sell products to over 30 countries.

In March 2021, HGTECH went through a restructuring which changed its owner to the Wuhan SASAC. While the controlling shareholder is listed as the Wuhan Guoheng Technology Investment Fund Partnership (also known as the Guoheng Fund), on regulatory filings, the "Actual Controller" (实际控制人) is listed as the Wuhan SASAC. The Guogeng fund is an intermediary by which the Wuhan SASAC retains ownership of Huagong Tech.

In June 2022, General Secretary of the Chinese Communist Party Xi Jinping visited Wuhan Huagong Laser Engineering, the laser subsidiary of HGTECH. It was the only tech company Xi visited during his tour of Wuhan.

In November 2023, HGTECH was reported to invest $50 million in building a five-hectare factory in the northern province of Bac Ninh in Vietnam.
