= Biolake =

Industrial park in Wuhan, China

Biolake, or the Wuhan National Bioindustry Base, is an industry base established in 2008 in the Optics Valley of China. Located in East Lake New Technology Development Zone of Wuhan, China, Biolake covers 15 square kilometers, and has six parks including Bio-innovation Park, Bio-pharma Park, Bio-agriculture Park, Bio-manufacturing Park, Medical Device Park and Medical Health Park, to accommodate both research activities and living.
