= Canglong East Street station =

Wuhan Metro station in Hubei, China

Canglong East Street 藏龙东街 metro

General information
- Location: Jiangxia District, Wuhan, Hubei; China
- Coordinates: 30.43963°N 114.42389°E
- Operated by: Wuhan Metro Co., Ltd
- Line: Line 2
- Platforms: 2 (1 island platform)

Construction
- Structure type: Underground

History
- Opened: February 19, 2019 (Line 2)

Services
Preceding station	Wuhan Metro	Following station
Xiuhu towards Tianhe International Airport	Line 2	Fozuling Terminus
Location

Canglong East Street Station (Chinese: 藏龙东街站) is a station on Line 2 of Wuhan Metro. It entered revenue service on February 19, 2019. It is located in Jiangxia District.

== Station layout ==
G	Entrances and Exits
B1	Concourse	Faregates, Station Agent
B2	Northbound	← Line 2 towards Tianhe International Airport (Xiuhu)
B2	Island platform, doors will open on the left
B2	Southbound	Line 2 towards Fozuling (Terminus) →
