= Hangkongzongbu station =

Wuhan Metro station

Hangkongzongbu 航空总部 metro
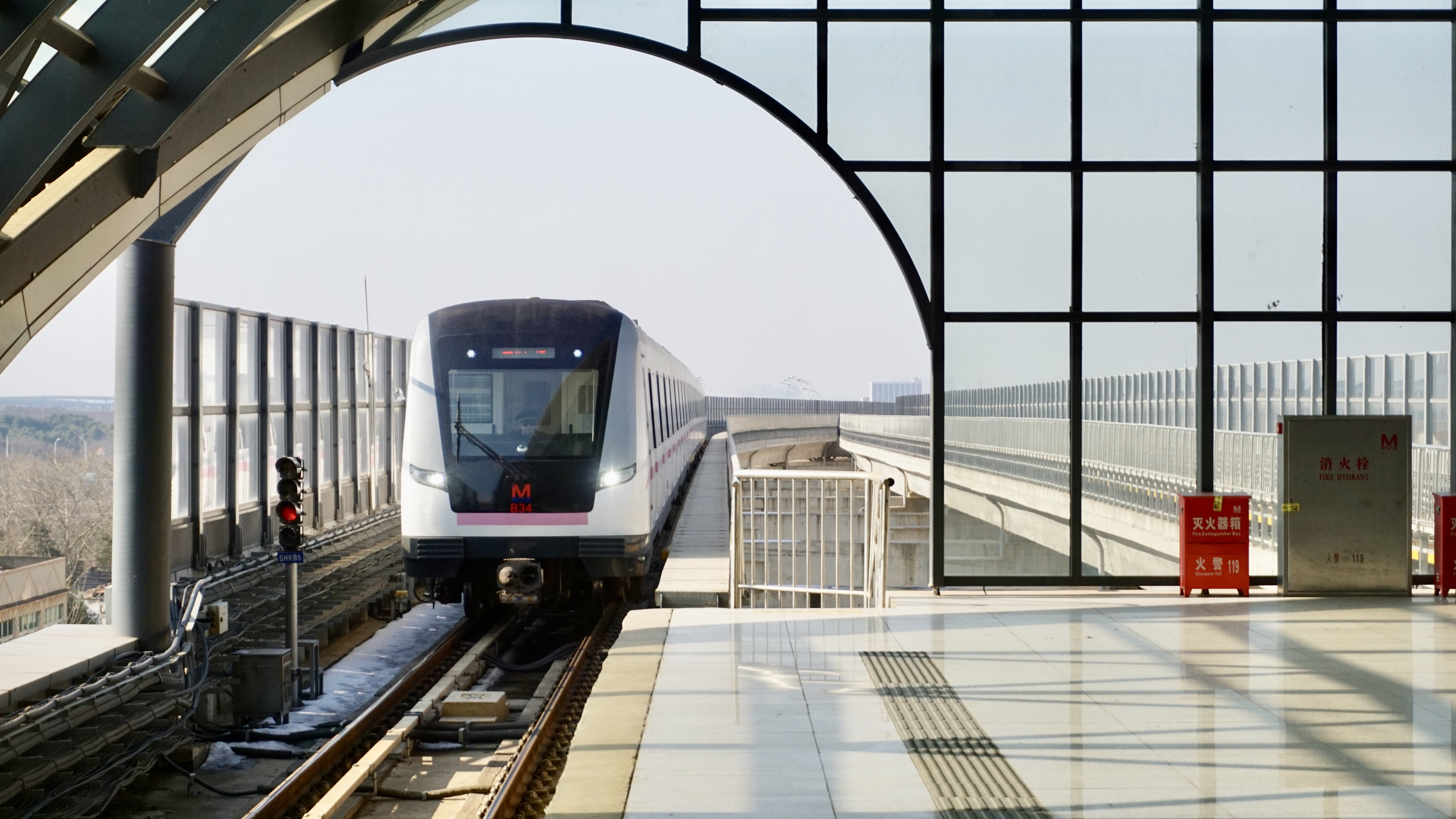

General information
- Location: Huangpi District, Wuhan, Hubei; China
- Operated by: Wuhan Metro Co., Ltd
- Line: Line 2
- Platforms: 2 (1 island platform)

Construction
- Structure type: Elevated

History
- Opened: December 28, 2016 (Line 2)

Services
Preceding station	Wuhan Metro	Following station
Tianhe International Airport Terminus	Line 2	Songjiagang towards Fozuling
Location

Hangkongzongbu Station (Chinese: 航空总部站) is a station on Line 2 of Wuhan Metro. It entered revenue service on December 28, 2016. It is located in Huangpi District.

== Station layout ==
3F	Northbound	← Line 2 towards Tianhe International Airport (Terminus)
3F	Island platform, doors will open on the left
3F	Southbound	Line 2 towards Fozuling (Songjiagang) →
2F	Concourse	Faregates, Station Agent
G	Entrances and Exits	Exits A-D
