= Guanggu =

Guanggu may refer to:

- Donghu New Technology Development Zone, which is trademarked and self-labeled as "Optics Valley" (pinyin: Guanggu) of China.
- Wuhan Optics Valley F.C., a preexisted soccer team of which the authority of the Development Zone was the title sponsor.
