= Optics Valley Square station =

Wuhan Metro station

Optics Valley Square 光谷广场
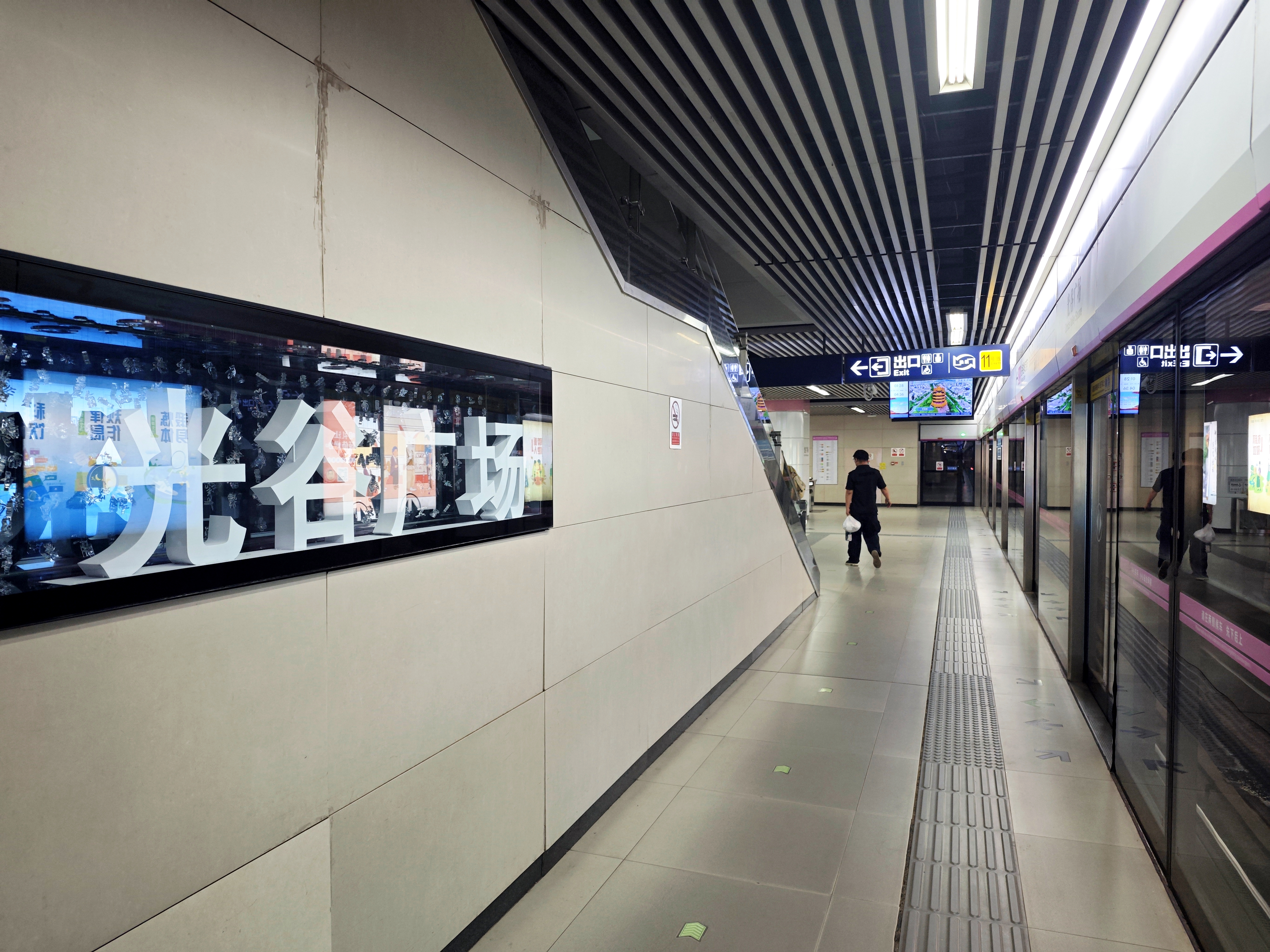
- Line 2 platform

General information
- Location: Donghu NTDZ District, Wuhan, Hubei; China
- Coordinates: 30°30′28″N 114°23′24″E
- Operator: Wuhan Metro Co., Ltd
- Lines: Line 2; Line 11; Line 9 (under planning)
- Platforms: 4 (2 island platforms)

Construction
- Structure type: Underground

History
- Opened: December 28, 2012 (Line 2); December 27, 2024 (Line 11)

Services
Preceding station	Wuhan Metro	Following station
Yangjiawan towards Tianhe International Airport	Line 2	Luoxiong Road towards Fozuling
Wuhan Sports University towards Jiang'an Road	Line 11	Guanshan Boulevard towards Gediannan Railway Station
Location

Optics Valley Square Station (Chinese: 光谷广场站) is a station of Line 2 and Line 11 of the Wuhan Metro. It served as the southeastern terminus of the line until February 19, 2019, when the extension of Line 2 to Fozuling opened. It entered revenue service on December 28, 2012. It is located in Donghu New Technology Development Zone. It is one of the busiest stations in the Wuhan Metro network serving 210,000 people on May 1, 2014. This station will be the interchange station of Line 2, Line 11 and Line 9.

== Station layout ==
G	Entrances and Exits	Exits B, C, E, F
B1	Concourse	Faregates, Station Agent
B2	Northbound	← Line 2 towards Tianhe International Airport (Yangjiawan)
B2	Island platform, doors will open on the left
B2	Southbound	Line 2 towards Fozuling (Luoxiong Road) →

== Gallery ==
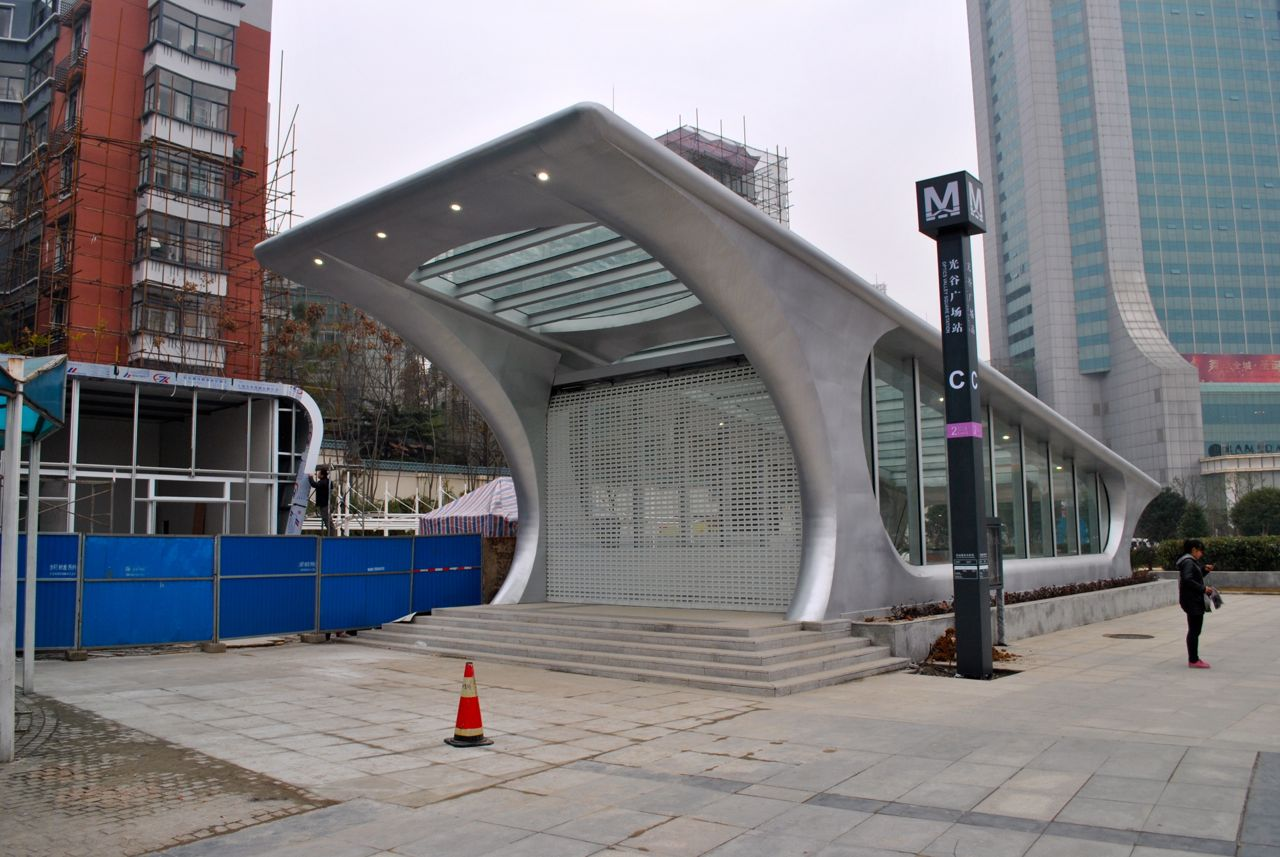
Entrance C

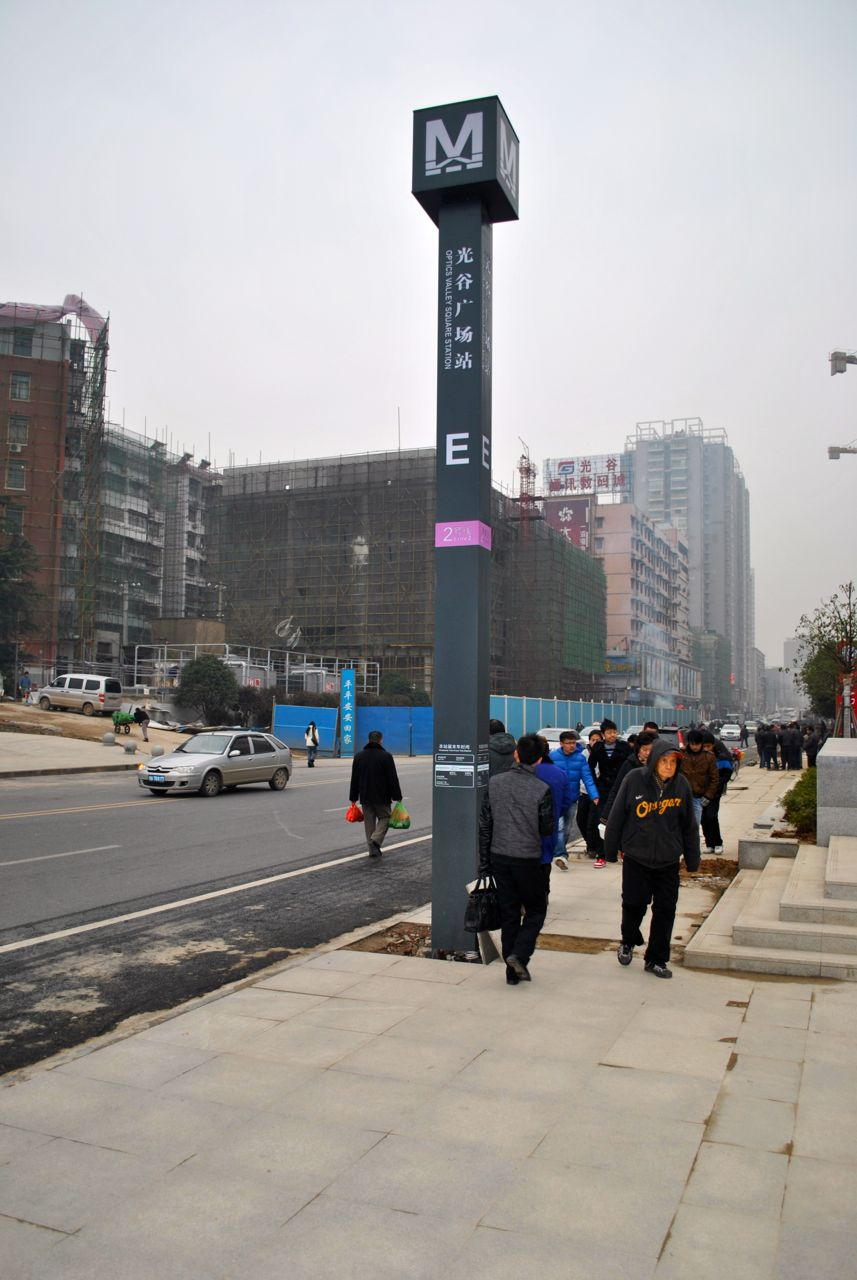
Entrance E Signpost

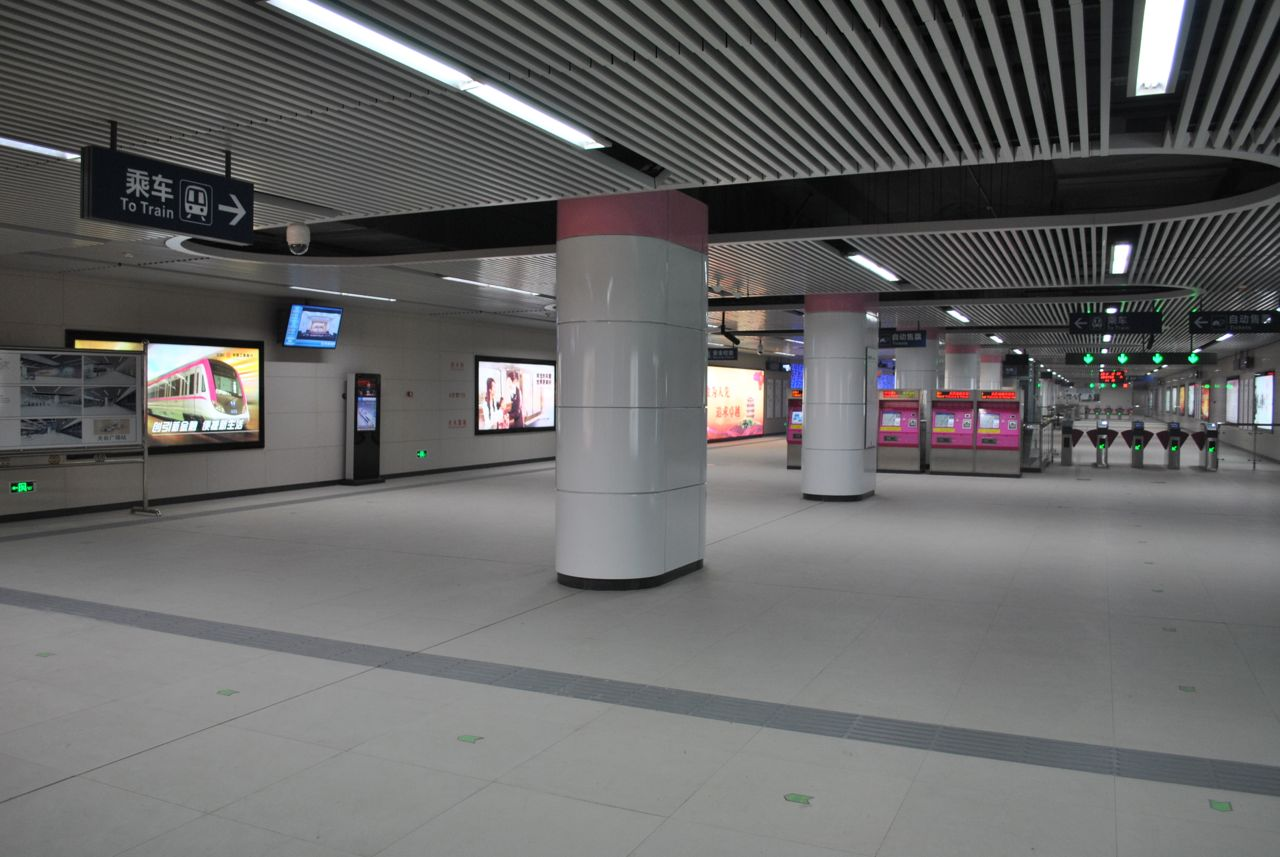
Station hall

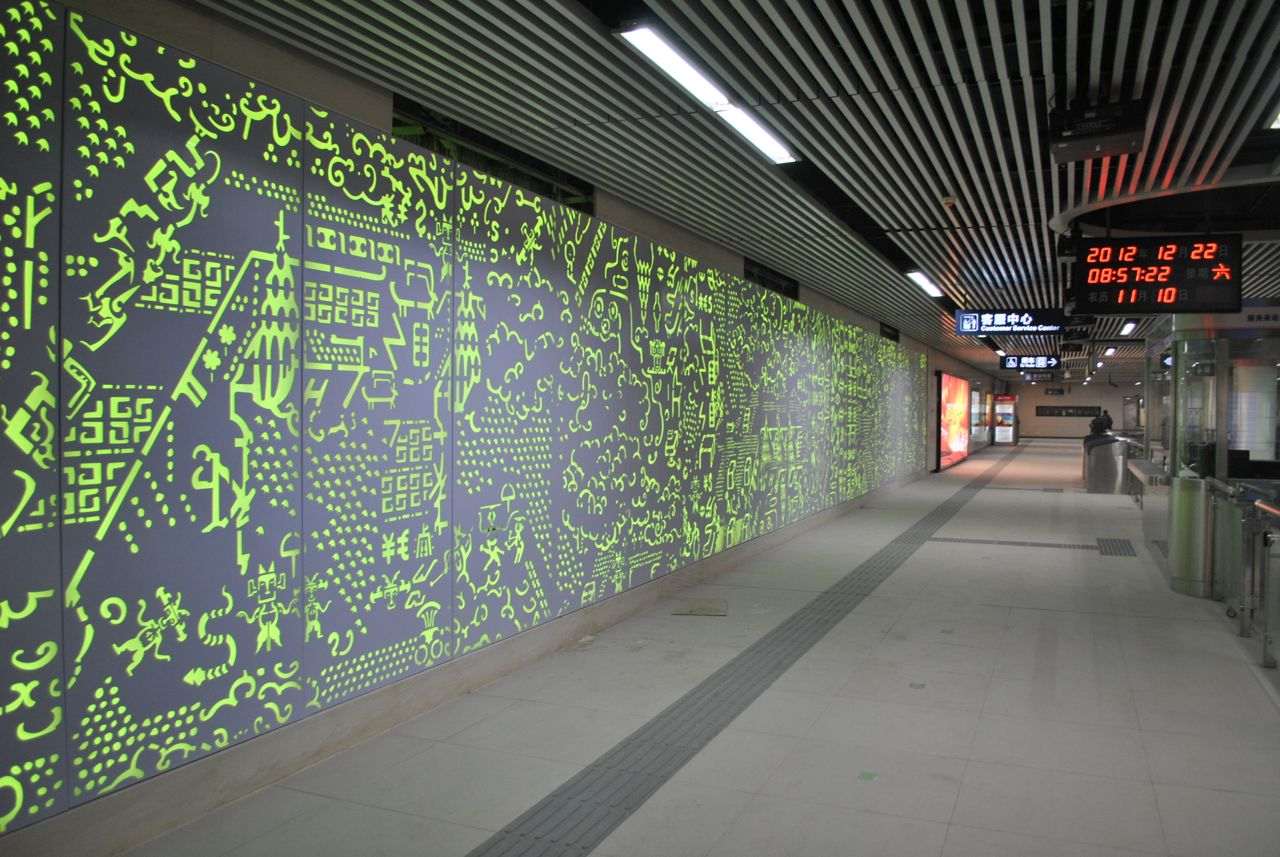
Wall

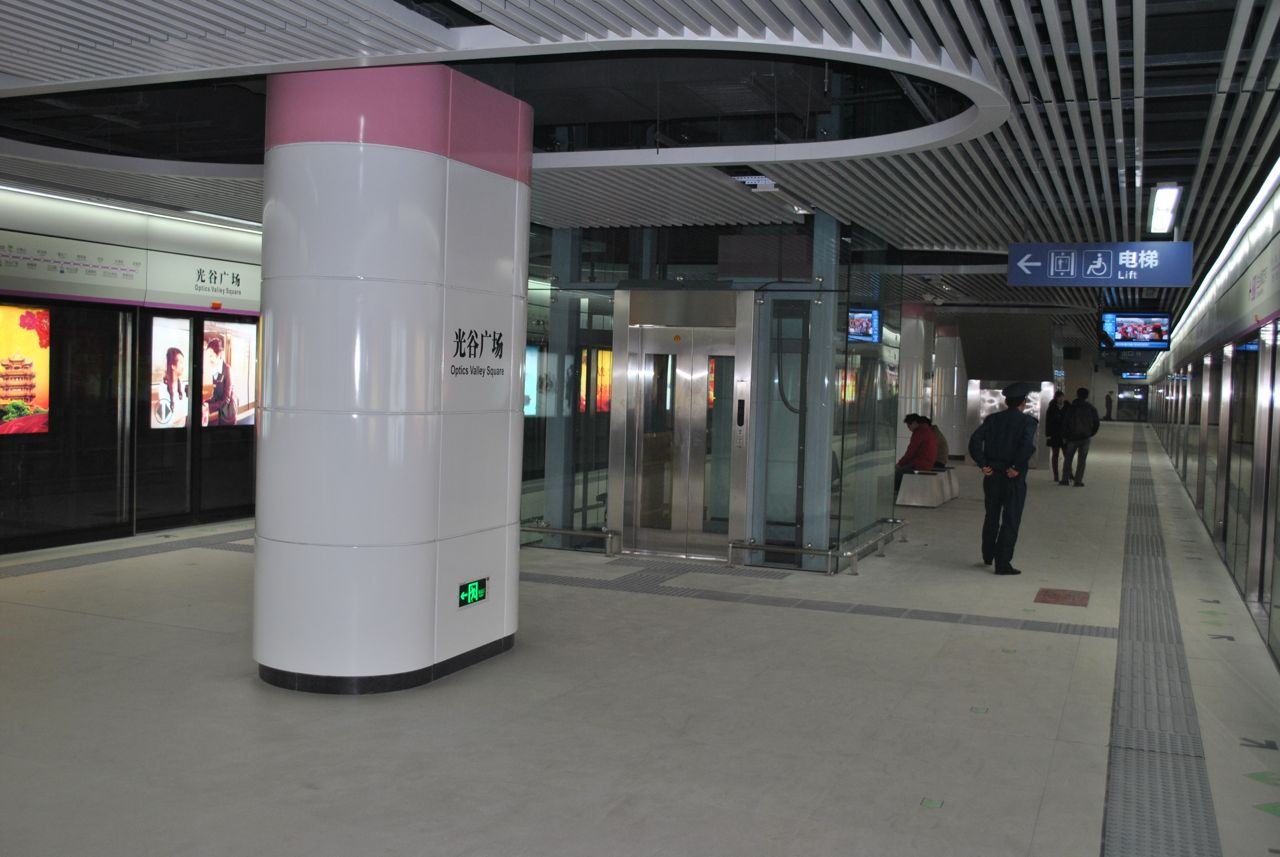
Line 2 platform

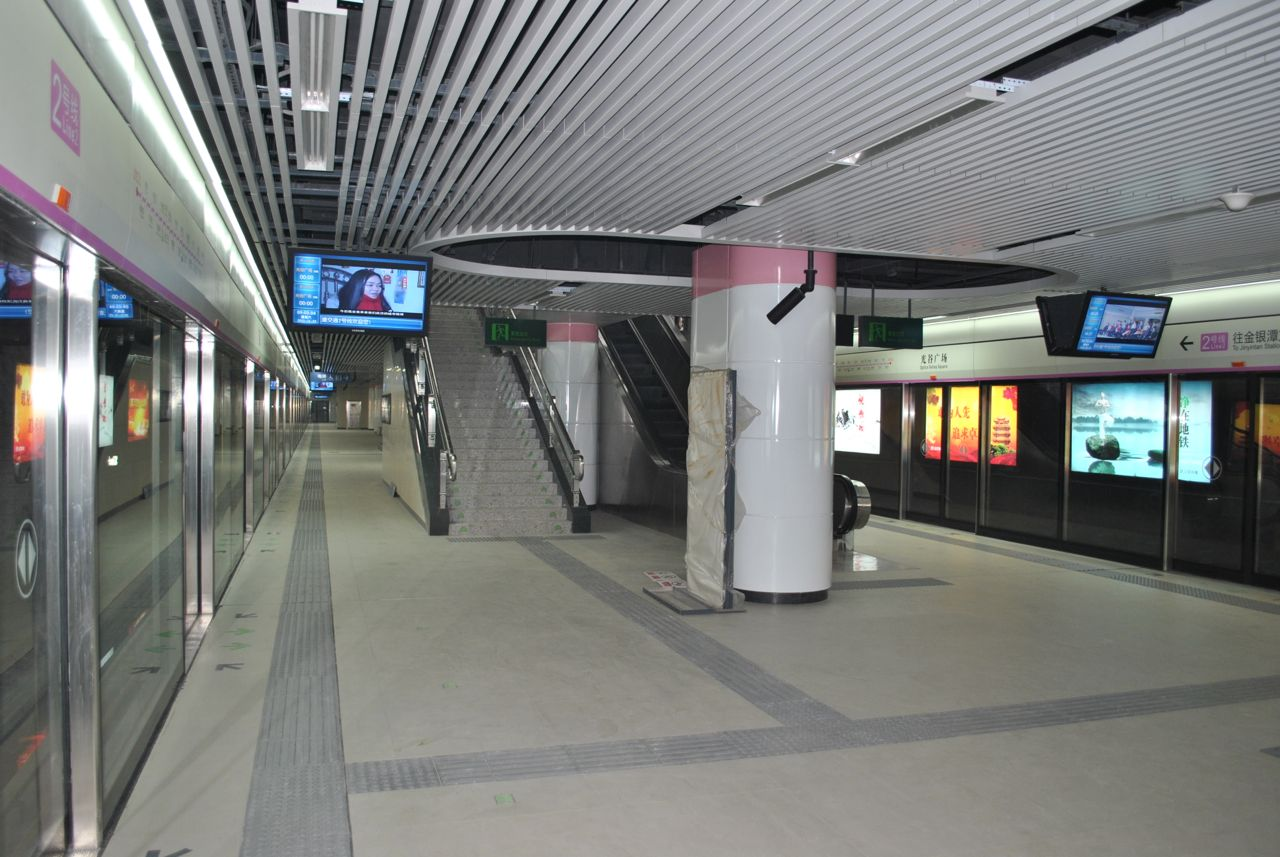

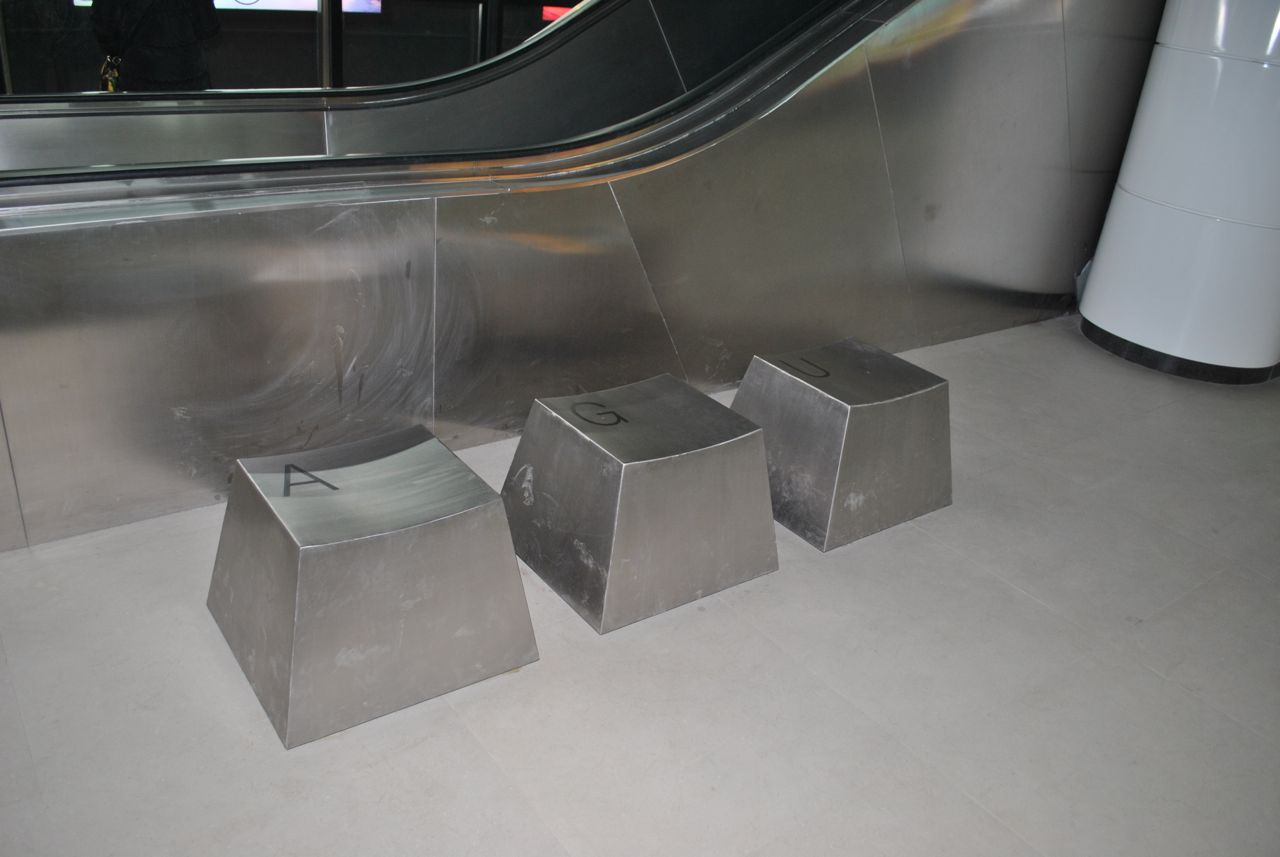
Desk

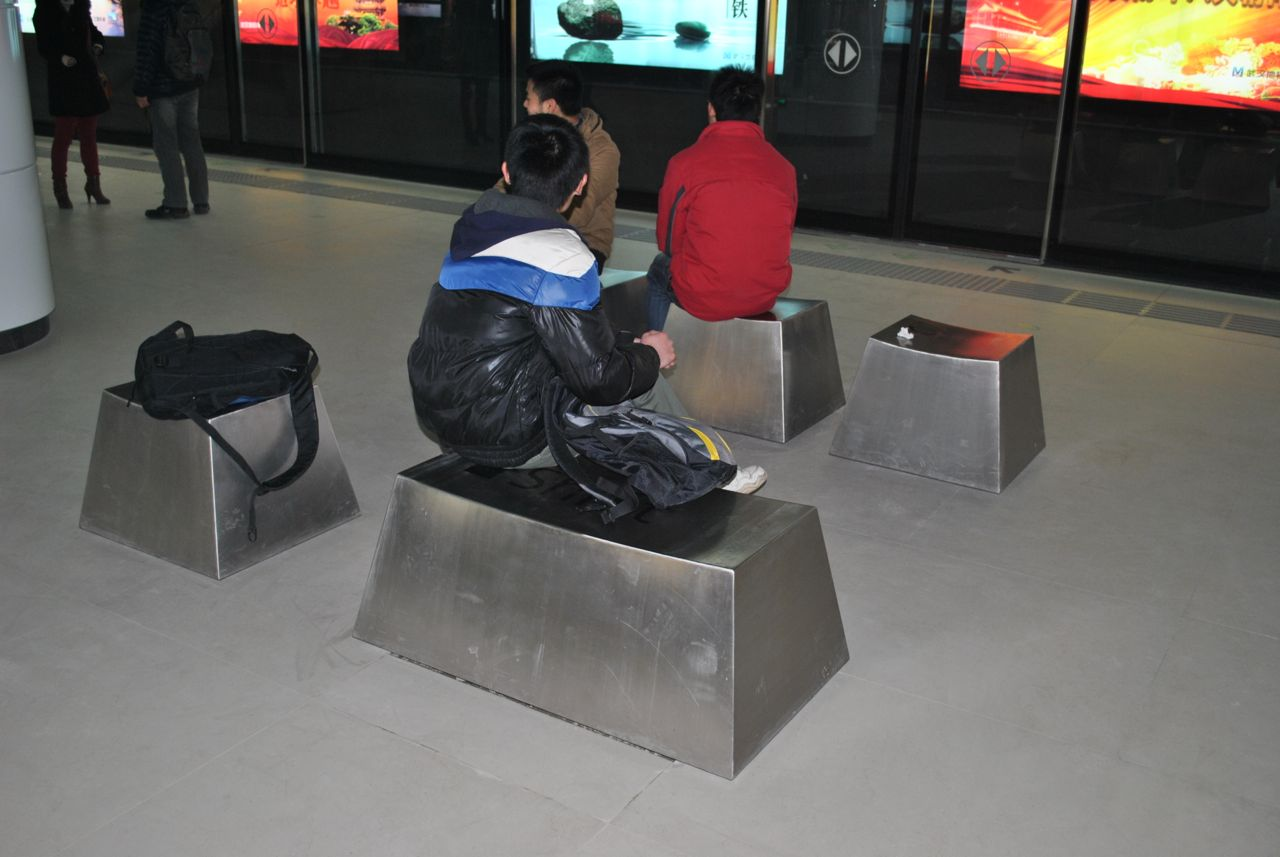

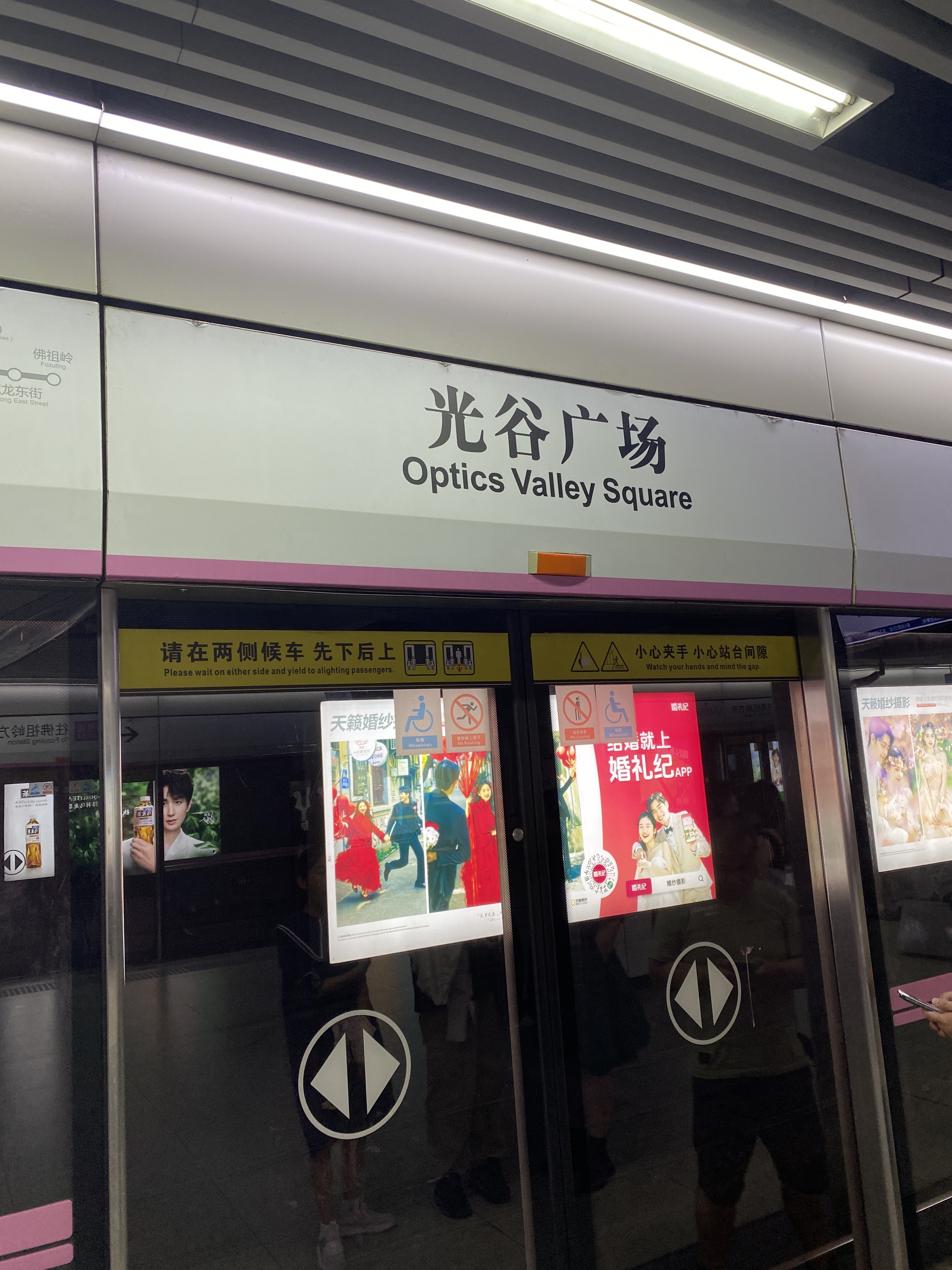
Line 2 platform sign

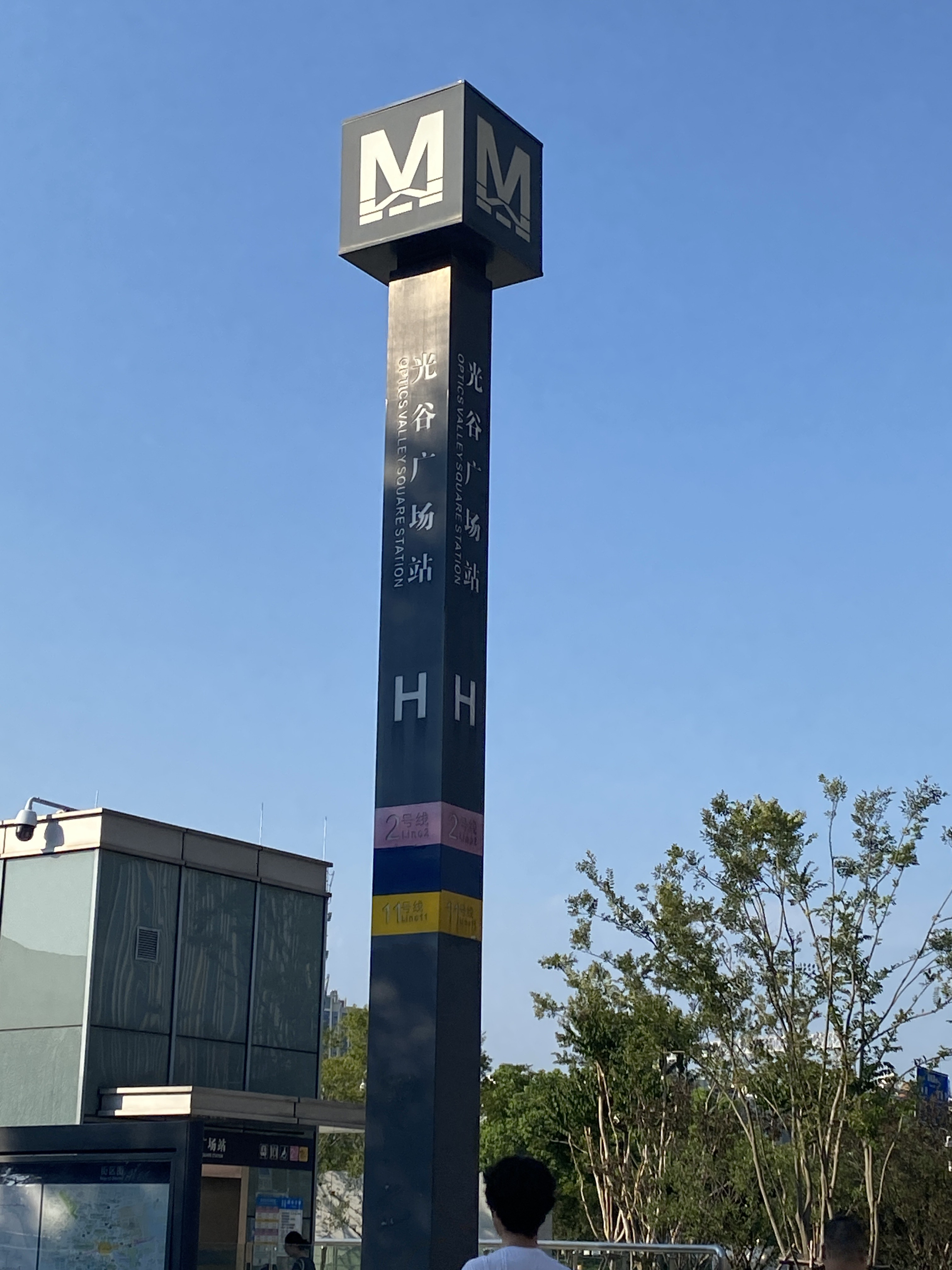
Entrance H Signpost
