= Line 2 (Wuhan Metro) =

Line of Wuhan Metro

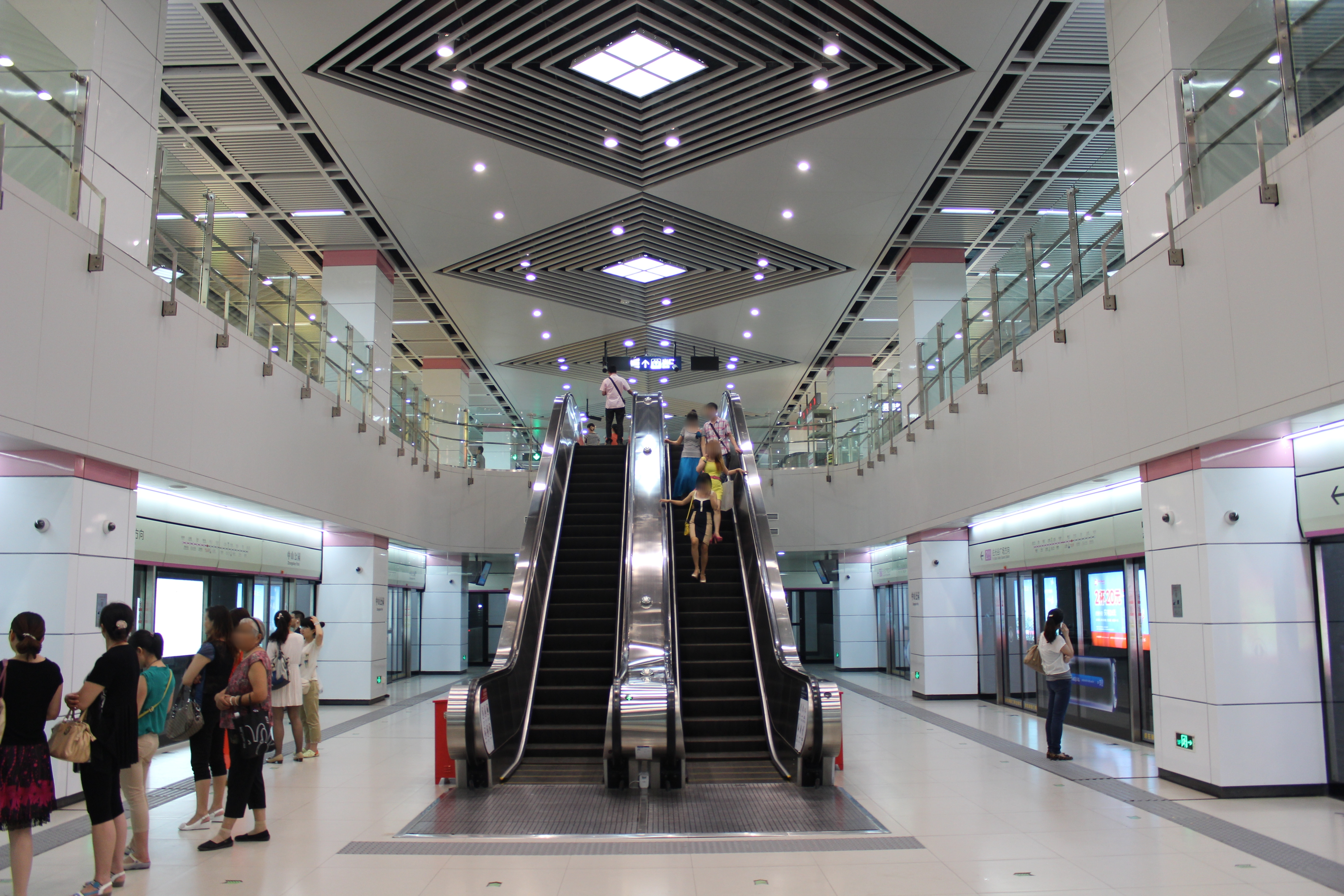
- Platform of Zhongshan Park

Overview
- Other name: Line 2n or Airport line (机场线)
- Status: Operational
- Owner: Wuhan
- Locale: Wuhan, Hubei
- Termini: Tianhe International Airport; Fozuling
- Stations: 39

Service
- Type: Rapid transit, Airport rail link
- System: Wuhan Metro
- Services: 1
- Operator: Wuhan Metro Group Co., Ltd.
- Rolling stock: CRRC Zhuzhou Locomotive Chinese Type B
- Daily ridership: 1,000,000 (2017 Avg.); 1,165,500 (April 2017 Peak)

History
- Opened: 28 December 2012; 13 years ago

Technical
- Line length: 60 km (37.28 mi)
- Number of tracks: 2
- Character: Underground and elevated
- Track gauge: 1,435 mm (4 ft 8 1/2 in) standard gauge
- Electrification: 750 V DC third rail
- Operating speed: 80 km/h (50 mph)
Route map

The Line 2 of Wuhan Metro (Chinese: 武汉地铁二号线) is the first underground metro line crossing the Yangtze River. The line started its trial run on September 25, 2012, and officially opened on December 28, 2012. It is Wuhan's second metro line after Line 1, and the city's first underground line, since Line 1 is mostly elevated. Line 2 runs in a northwest–southeast direction, connecting Hankou and Wuchang, including Hankou Railway Station and major commercial districts.

The number of single day passengers on Line 2 has exceeded 500,000 on January 1, 2013, the first weekday after its opening, excluding elders holding free passes. When more lines interchangeable with Line 2 open around 2015, the passenger volume could reach 1 million per day. And such number was consistently reached by April 2017. To accommodate such huge traffic numbers, all stations on Line 2 have been extended to the length of 8-car trains for future use.

Line 2 is an important metro line in the Wuhan Metro system for being able to carry the heavy cross-Yangtze traffic in Wuhan.

== Overview ==
- Length: 60 kilometres (37 mi)
- Gauge: 1,435 mm (4 ft 8 1/2 in) standard gauge
- Stations: 38.
- Double track: full line.
- Electrified: full line.
- Underground: full line.
- Traffic direction: right-hand side.

== History ==
Construction initially began on November 16, 2006, at Fanhu Station under a test-initiative program. and the National Development and Reform Commission approved all construction of the line on September 1, 2007. The tunnels were completed on February 26, 2012, and the line started revenue service on December 28, 2012. It was extended to Wuhan Tianhe International Airport on December 28, 2016. An extension of the line to the south in Donghu New Technology Development Zone is operating and was opened on February 19, 2019.

On the first day of the system's operations, 132,000 passengers were counted entering or exiting the system at the line's last station in Wuchang, Optics Valley Square (Guanggu Guangchang). By the early 2013, the weekday daily ridership (entries + exits) at the same station was counted at 95,000. As of April 2013 the daily ridership of Line 2 averaged 383,600 people per day.

Segment	Commencement	Length	Station(s)	Name
Jinyintan — Optics Valley Square	28 December 2012	27.152 km (16.87 mi)	21	Phase 1
Tianhe International Airport — Jinyintan	28 December 2016	19.957 km (12.40 mi)	7	Airport extension
Optics Valley Square — Fozuling	19 February 2019	13.35 km (8.30 mi)	10	Southern extension

== Stations ==
Station name		Connections	Distance km		Location
English	Chinese	Connections	Distance km		Location
Tianhe International Airport	天河机场	WXG WUH	0.000	0.000	Huangpi
Hangkongzongbu	航空总部		6.004	6.004	Huangpi
Songjiagang	宋家岗		1.427	7.431	Huangpi
Julong Boulevard	巨龙大道	7	2.039	9.470	Huangpi
Panlongcheng	盘龙城		1.643	11.113	Huangpi
Hongtu Boulevard	宏图大道	3 8	3.946	15.059	Dongxihu
Changqingcheng	常青城		2.886	17.945	Dongxihu
Jinyintan	金银潭		2.012	19.957	Dongxihu
Changqing Huayuan	常青花园	6	1.092	21.049	Dongxihu
Changgang Road	长港路		1.725	22.774	Jianghan
Hankou Railway Station	汉口火车站	10 12 WXG HKN	1.407	24.181	Jianghan
Fanhu	范湖	3	1.216	25.397	Jianghan
Wangjiadun East	王家墩东	7	1.410	26.807	Jianghan
Qingnian Road	青年路		1.002	27.809	Jianghan
Zhongshan Park	中山公园		0.946	28.755	Jianghan
Xunlimen	循礼门	1	1.543	30.298	Jianghan
Jianghan Road	江汉路	6	0.897	31.195	Jianghan
Jiyuqiao	积玉桥	5	3.292	34.487	Wuchang
Pangxiejia	螃蟹岬	7	1.579	36.066	Wuchang
Xiaoguishan	小龟山		0.930	36.996	Wuchang
Hongshan Square	洪山广场	4	1.168	38.164	Wuchang
Zhongnan Road	中南路	4	0.966	39.130	Wuchang
Baotong Temple	宝通寺		1.418	40.548	Wuchang
Jiedaokou	街道口	8	1.238	41.786	Hongshan
Guangbutun	广埠屯		0.951	42.737	Hongshan
Huquan	虎泉	11	1.613	44.350	Hongshan
Yangjiawan	杨家湾	Wuhan BRT	1.442	45.792	Hongshan
Optics Valley Square	光谷广场	11	1.317	47.109	Hongshan
Luoxiong Road	珞雄路	Optics Valley Tram (via Walking Street and Hospital of Traditional Chinese Medicine Station)	0.794	47.903	Hongshan
Huazhong University of Science and Technology	华中科技大学	Optics Valley Tram	1.009	48.912	Hongshan
Guanggu Boulevard	光谷大道		0.817	49.729	Hongshan
Jiayuan Road	佳园路		1.368	51.097	Hongshan
Wuhandong Railway Station	武汉东站	11 LFN	1.487	52.584	Jiangxia
Huanglongshan Road	黄龙山路		1.059	53.643	Jiangxia
Jinronggang North	金融港北	Optics Valley Tram (via Optics Valley Avenue)	2.038	55.681	Hongshan/Jiangxia
Xiuhu	秀湖		1.603	57.284	Hongshan/Jiangxia
Canglong East Street	藏龙东街		1.999	59.283	Jiangxia
Fozuling	佛祖岭	Optics Valley Tram	1.021	60.304	Jiangxia

=== Change of Names ===
On August 23, 2012, five stations were renamed according to the result of a poll.

- Jinse Yayuan and Mingdu Stations were firstly named after nearby real estate development, and was subsequently renamed as "Changgang Road" and "Yangjiawan" respectively to avoid advertising for the development.
- "Hankou Railway Station Station" has been renamed "Hankou Railway Station" to avoid unnecessary repetition and pronunciation challenges.
- "Jia" in Pangxiejia has a homophone that tells the story of history as the site of Metro station was once a section of the ancient city walls of Wuchang that were built along the Pangxiejia ridge.
- "Xiaoguishan" replaced Tiyu South Road (Tiyunanlu) to make the historical places more easily recognizable.

=== Paired Cross-Platform Transfer ===
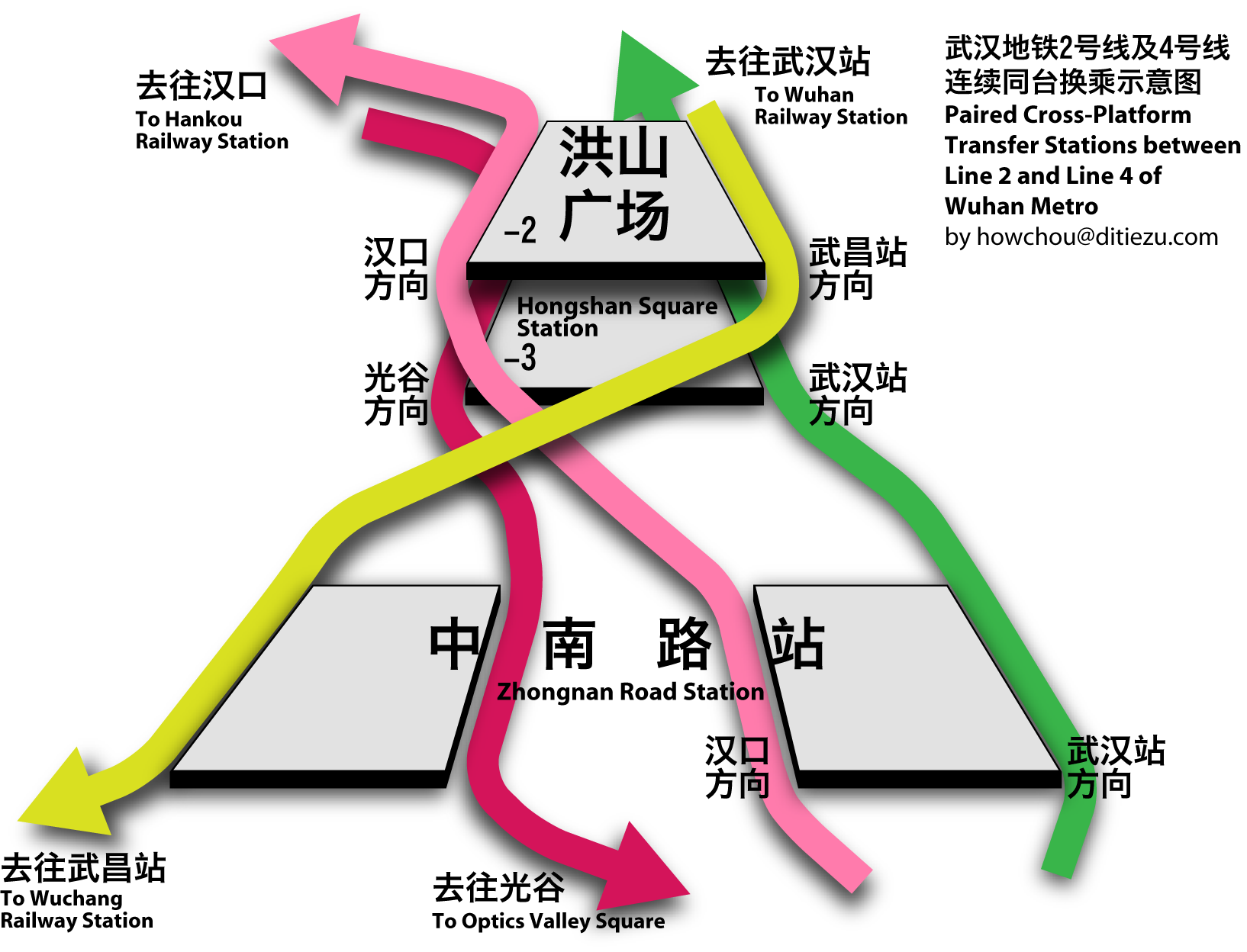
3D map

2D map

Hongshan Square station and Zhongnan Road station offer paired cross-platform interchange for passengers riding between 4 directions of the two lines. The configuration for the two stations is similar to that of Mong Kok and Prince Edward stations in Hong Kong's Mass Transit Railway.

Passengers riding on Line 2 from Hankou wishing to reach Wuchang railway station, can transfer at Zhongnan Road station by crossing the platform. Those who going to Wuhan railway station, can transfer at Hongshan Square station by crossing the platform, and vice versa.

=== Female Waiting Area ===
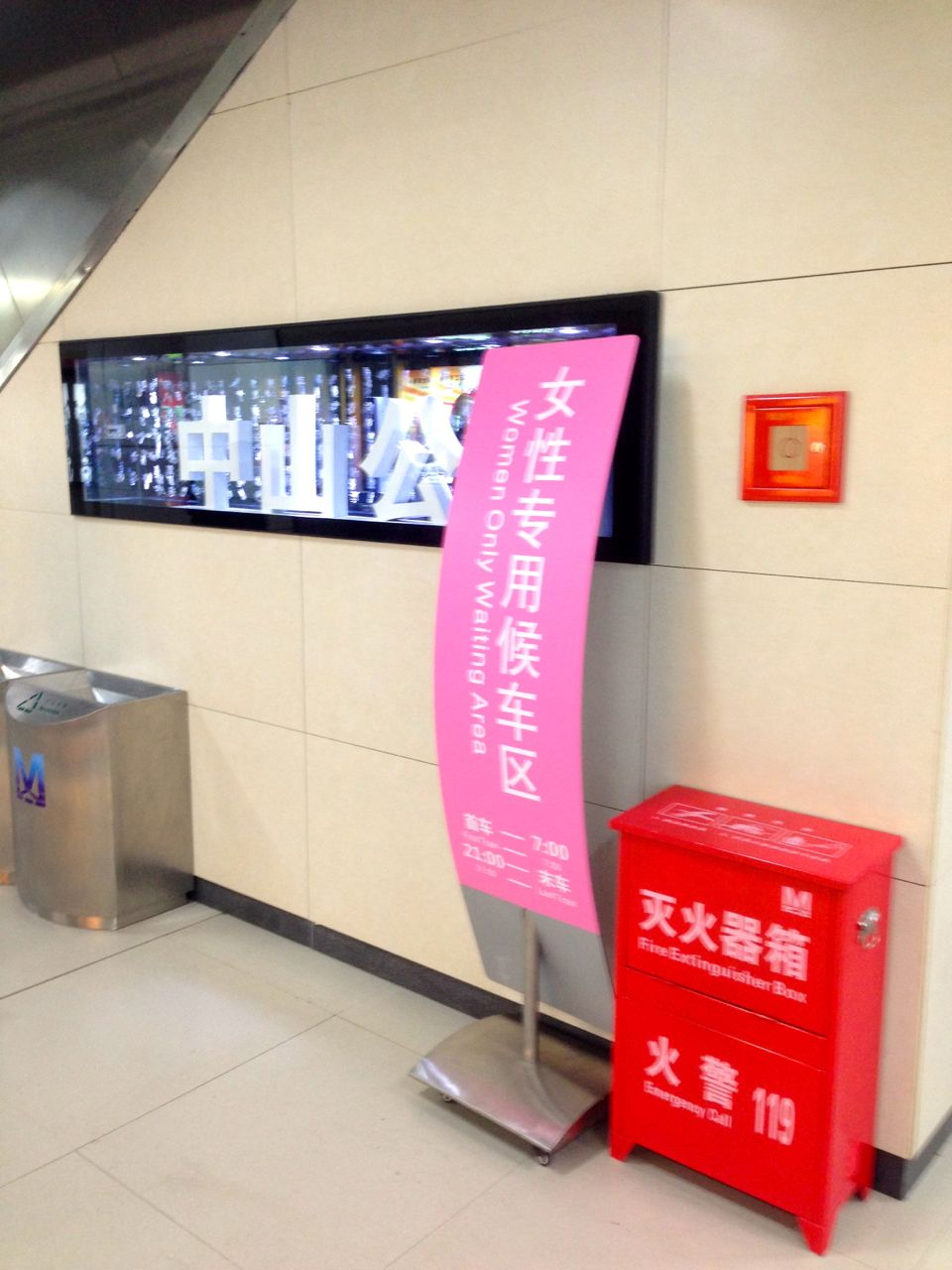
Female Waiting Area in Zhongshan Park station

Stations of Line 2 provides female only waiting area during hours of operation, following the example of Tokyo, Osaka, Nagoya, Tehran and Mexico City, to protect female riders from sexual harassment. Wuhan became the first city to set up female only waiting area in China.

=== Starbucks Metro Store ===
China's first Starbucks Metro store is opened in Hongshan Square station.

=== Sale of Partial Naming Rights ===
Partial naming rights of Jianghan Road station of this line was sold to a local snack producer, Zhouheiya (Zhou's dark duck), and has aroused public discontent with the Wuhan Metro Group company. Some are upset by the fact that Metro company sold the rights without public input; some are because the product is not of high taste, and might affect the image of the city; some think it is fine, for selling partial naming rights is a good way to attract funding from the private sector, and does not materially affect the quality of the service.

As of November 23, 2012, all sale of partial naming rights are canceled.

== Rolling stock ==
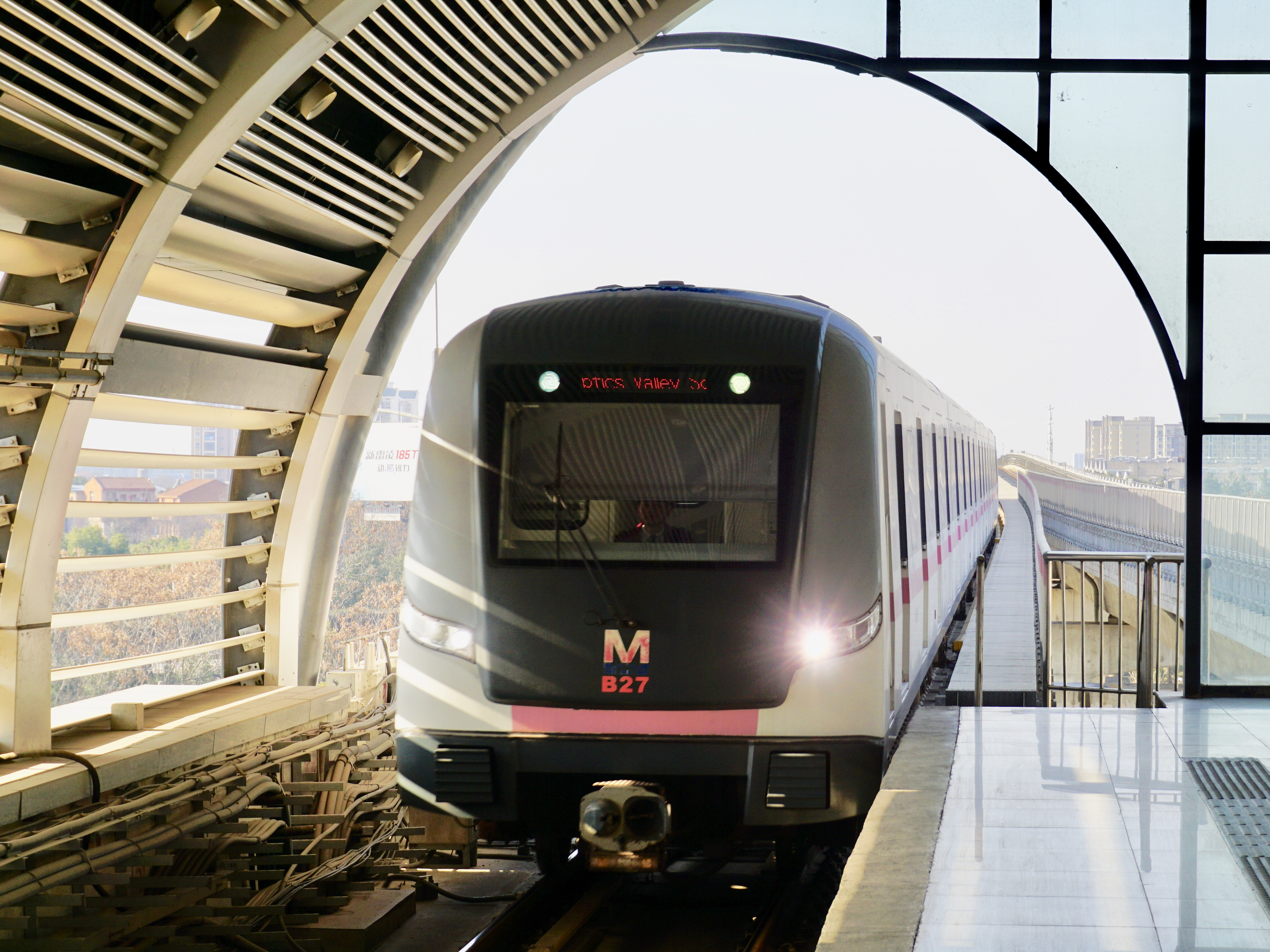
Line 2 train

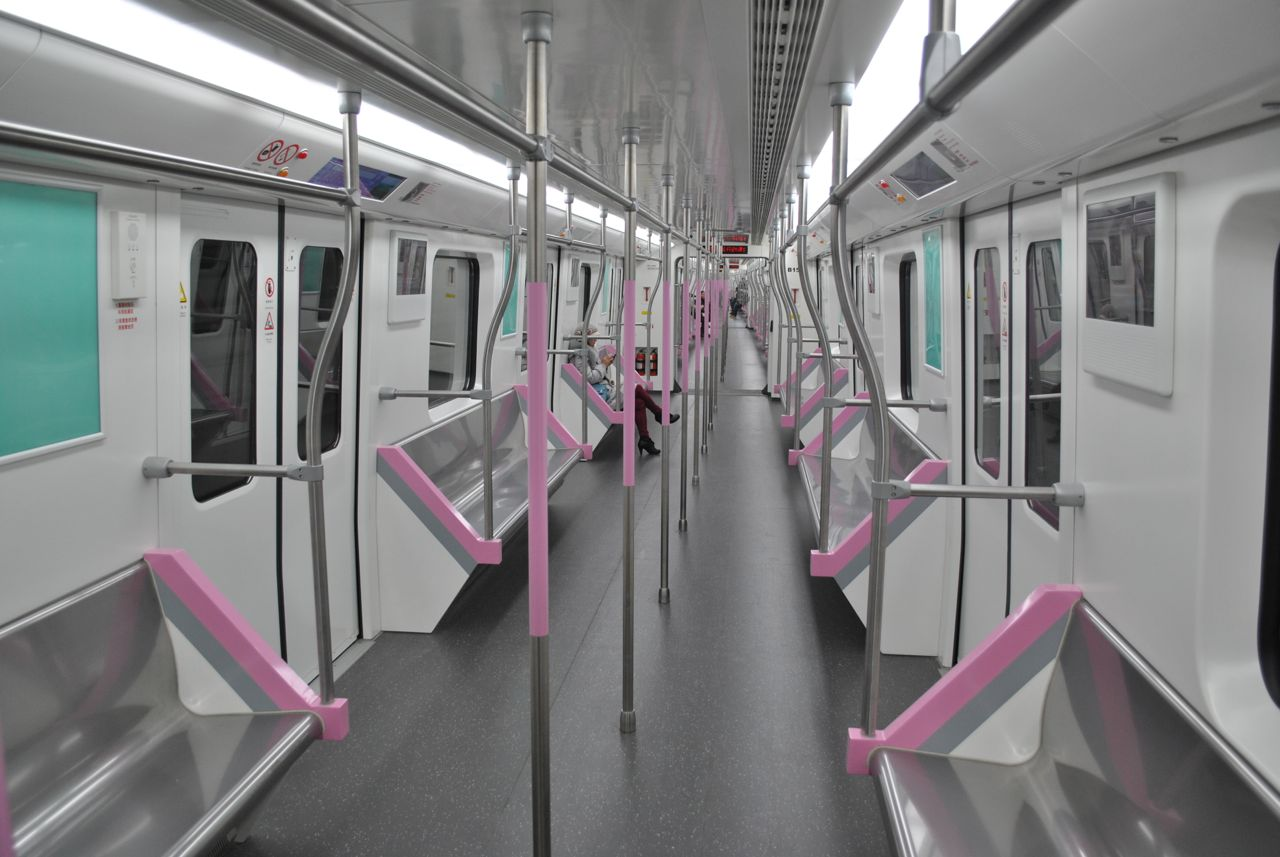
Inside the train

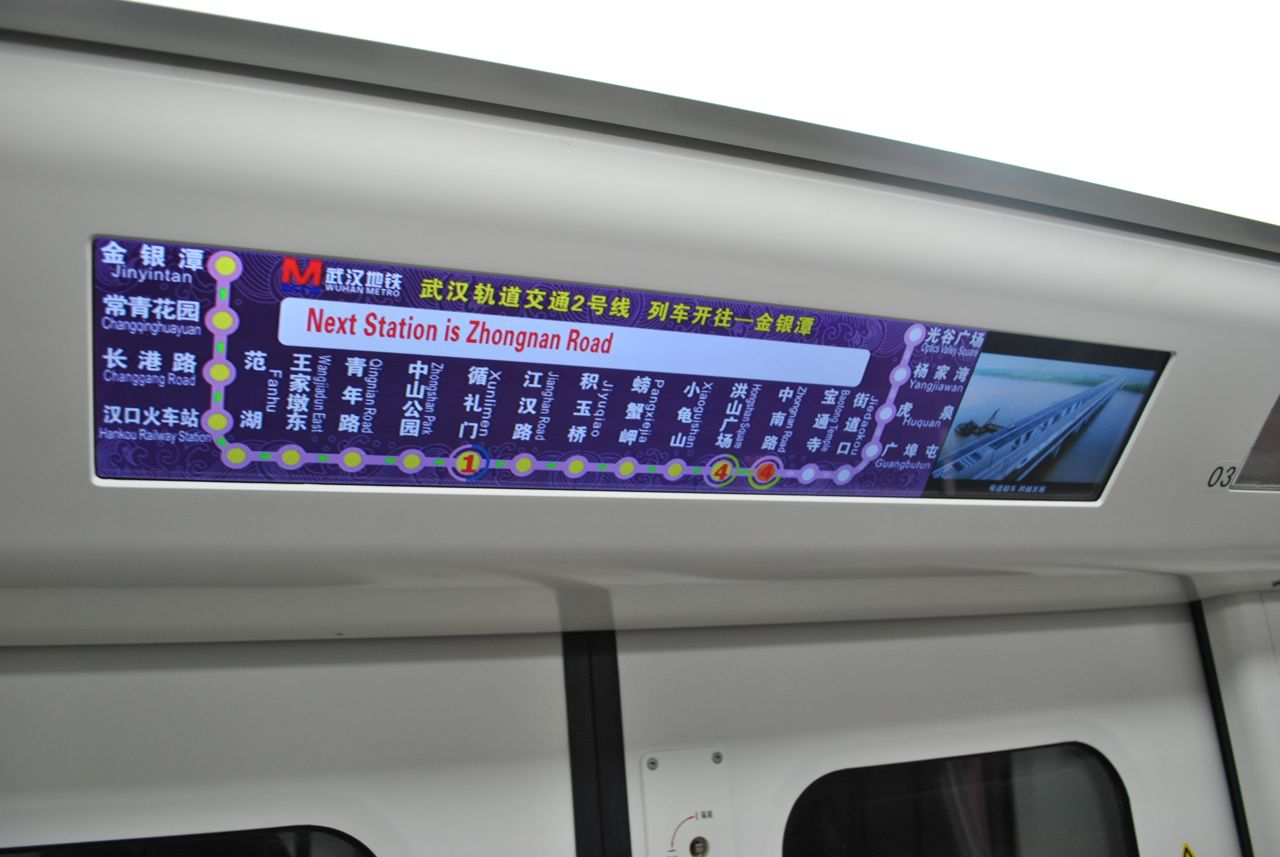
Interior LCD

Type	Time of manufacturing	Lines operated	Cars	Assembly	Notes
Type B	2011–2012	Line 2, Wuhan Metro	180	Tc+M+M+M+M+Tc	Manufactured by Zhuzhou Electric Locomotive Co., Ltd.

The rolling stock for Line 2 is currently 6-car trains, with 100 km/h (62 mph) max speed, 80 km/h (50 mph) operational max speed and 36.6 km/h (22.7 mph) average running speed. The collection shoe is installed on the lower part of the vehicle. The third rail is a mix of steel and aluminum. A full train provides 176 seats, and can carry 1276 passengers by Chinese regulation of 9 people per square meter. In the future 8-car trains will be used.

== See also ==
- Wuhan Metro
- Wuhan
