= Donghu New Technology Development Zone =

Technology park in Wuhan, China

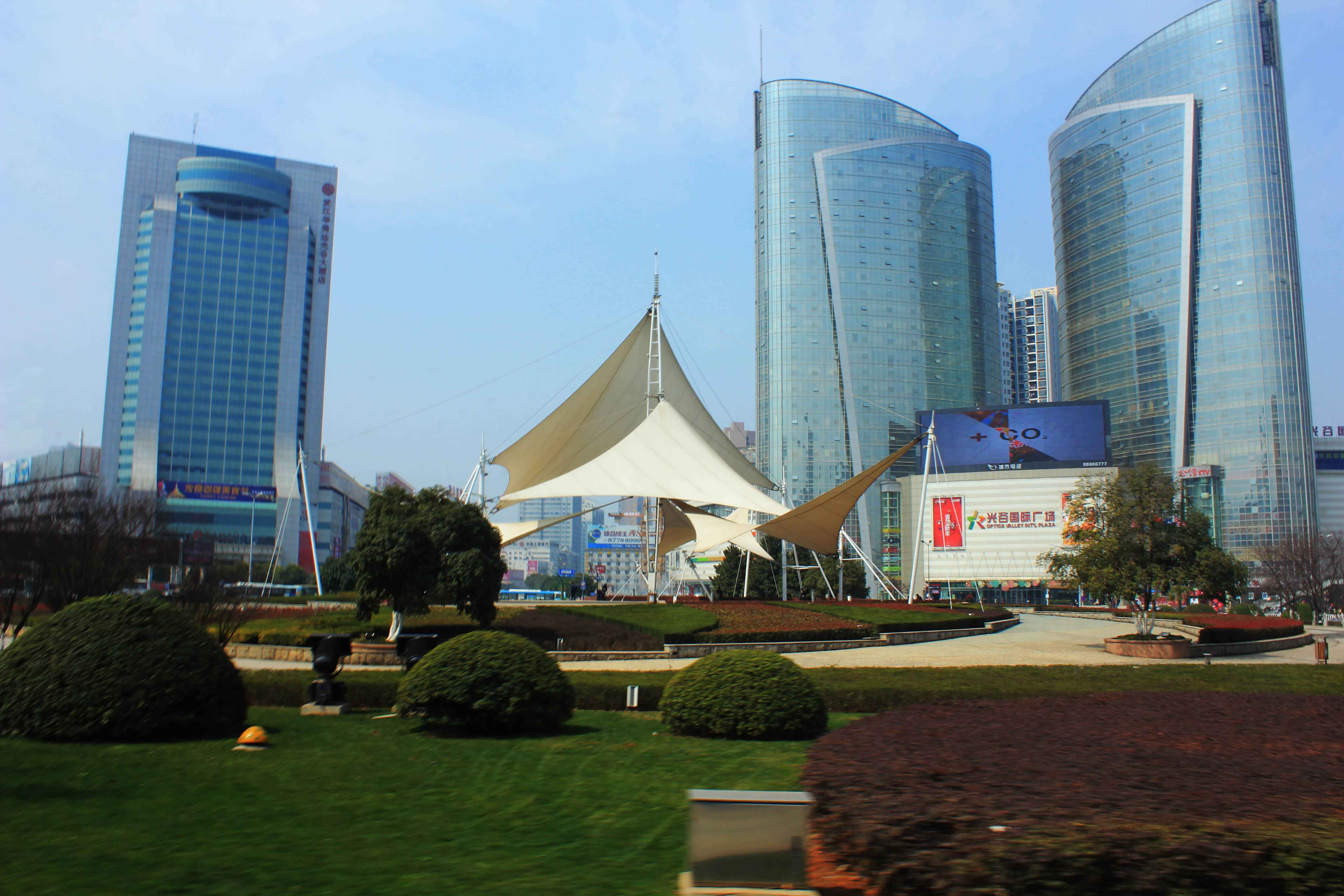
Optics Valley Square

Donghu New Technology Development Zone (Chinese: 东湖新技术产业开发区), also referred to as Optics Valley (Chinese: 光谷; pinyin: Guānggǔ) or Guanggu, is a New Technology Development Zone in Wuhan, China. It was established in 1988. In 1991 it was approved as one of the National Economic and Technological Development Zones of China. In 2011 it was designated as a New Technology Development Zone for Optical technology, and since then self-labeled as the "Optics Valley" of China.

The Development Zone is situated east of Wuchang District in Wuhan, west of Ezhou, north of Jiangxia District, south of Donghu (East Lake).

The authority of the Development Zone has registered "Guanggu" as its trademark since 2009.
