= Fozuling station =

Wuhan Metro station

Fozuling 佛祖岭

General information
- Location: Jiangxia District, Wuhan, Hubei; China
- Operated by: Wuhan Metro Co., Ltd
- Line: Line 2
- Platforms: 2 (2 side platforms)

Construction
- Structure type: Underground

History
- Opened: February 19, 2019 (Line 2)

Services
Preceding station	Wuhan Metro	Following station
Canglong East Street towards Tianhe International Airport	Line 2	Terminus
Location

Fozuling Station (Chinese: 佛祖岭站) is a station on Line 2 of Wuhan Metro and it is the southern terminus of Line 2. It entered revenue service on February 19, 2019. It is located in Jiangxia District.

== Station layout ==
G	Concourse	Faregates, Station Agent
B1	Side platform, doors will open on the right
B1	Northbound	← Line 2 towards Tianhe International Airport (Canglong East Street)
B1	Southbound	Line 2 termination platform →
B1	Side platform, doors will open on the right
