= Tianhe International Airport station =

Wuhan Metro station

Tianhe International Airport 天河机场
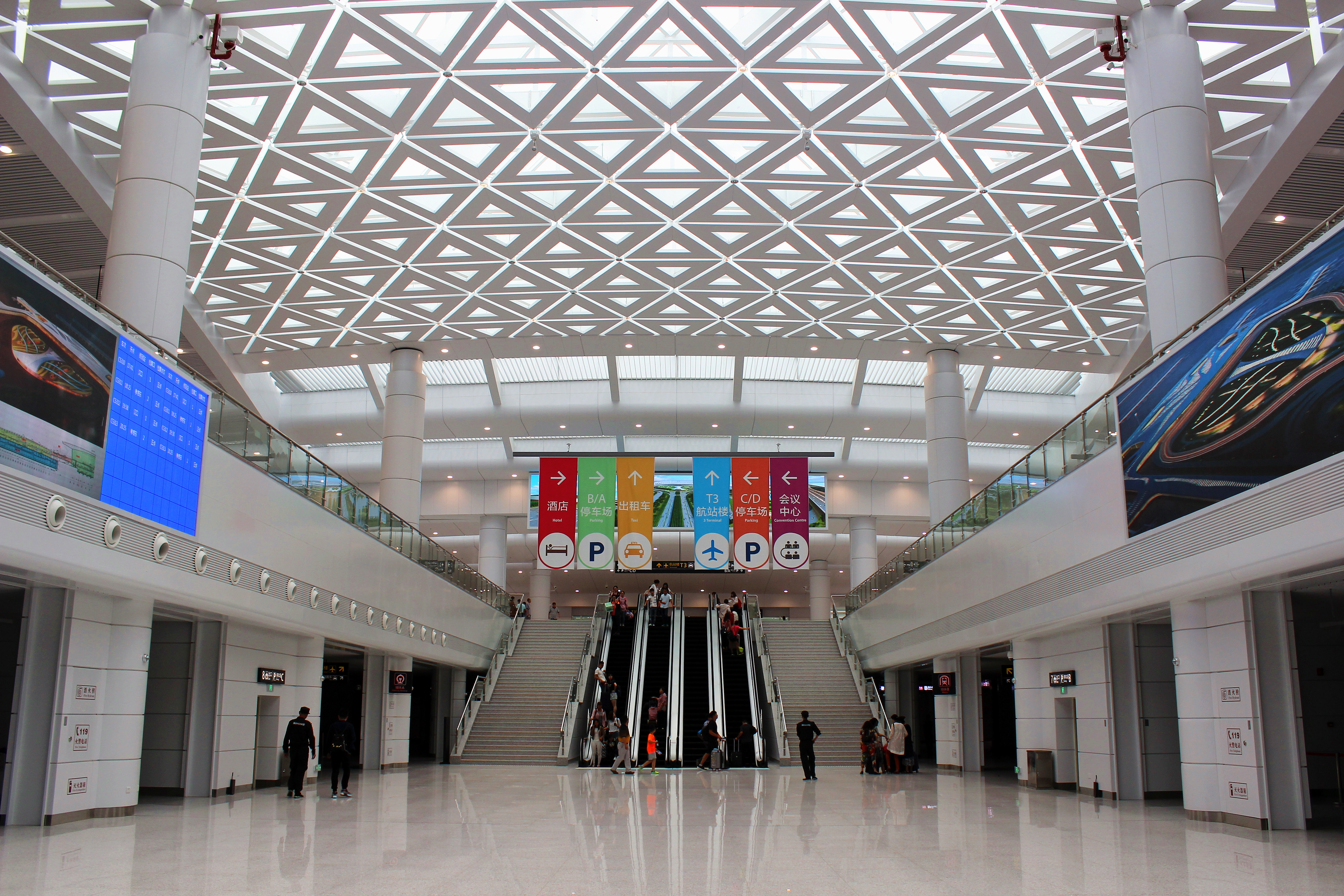

General information
- Location: Huangpi District, Wuhan, Hubei; China
- Operated by: Wuhan Metro Co., Ltd
- Line: Line 2
- Platforms: 2 (1 island platform)

Construction
- Structure type: Underground

History
- Opened: December 28, 2016 (Line 2)

Services
Preceding station	Wuhan Metro	Following station
Terminus	Line 2	Hangkongzongbu towards Fozuling
Location

Tianhe International Airport Station (Chinese: 天河机场站) is a station on Line 2 of Wuhan Metro and it is the northern terminus of Line 2. It entered revenue service on December 28, 2016. It is located in Huangpi District and it serves Wuhan Tianhe International Airport.

== Station layout ==
G	Entrances and Exits	Exits A-D
B1	Concourse	Faregates, Station Agent
B2	Northbound	Line 2 (platform not in use)
B2	Island platform, doors will open on the left
B2	Southbound	Line 2 towards Fozuling (Hangkongzongbu) →

== Gallery ==
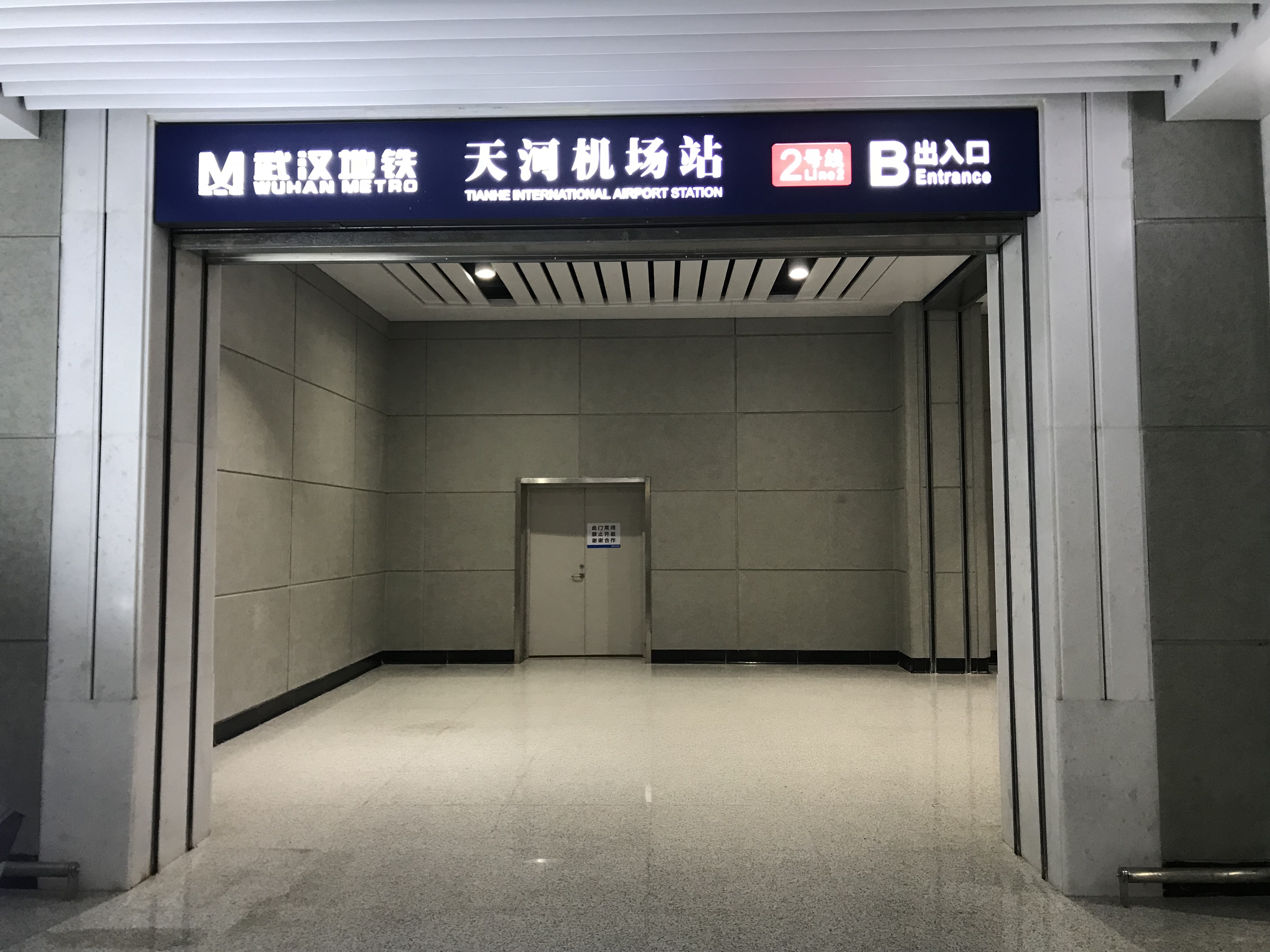
Entrance B

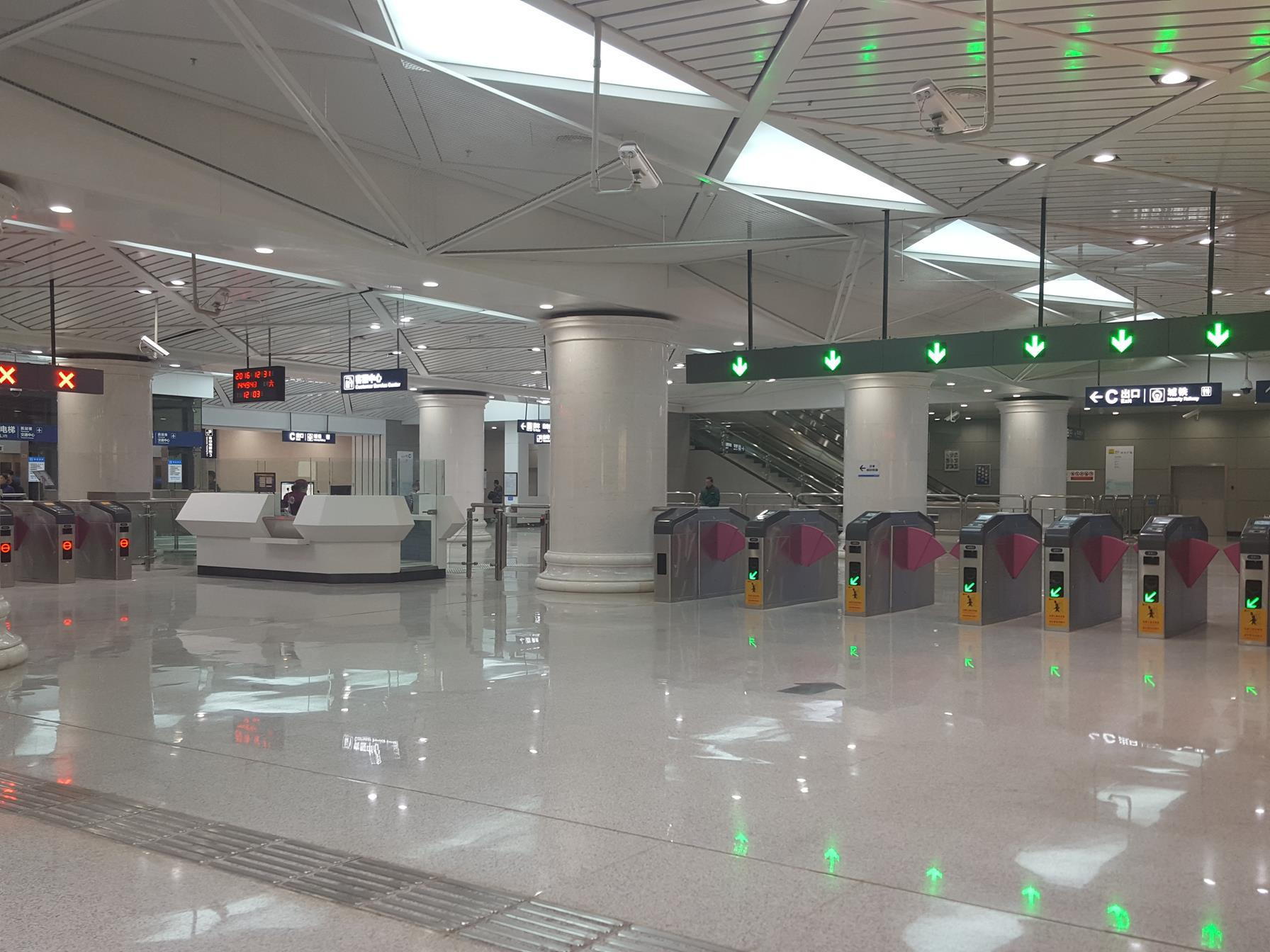
Concourse

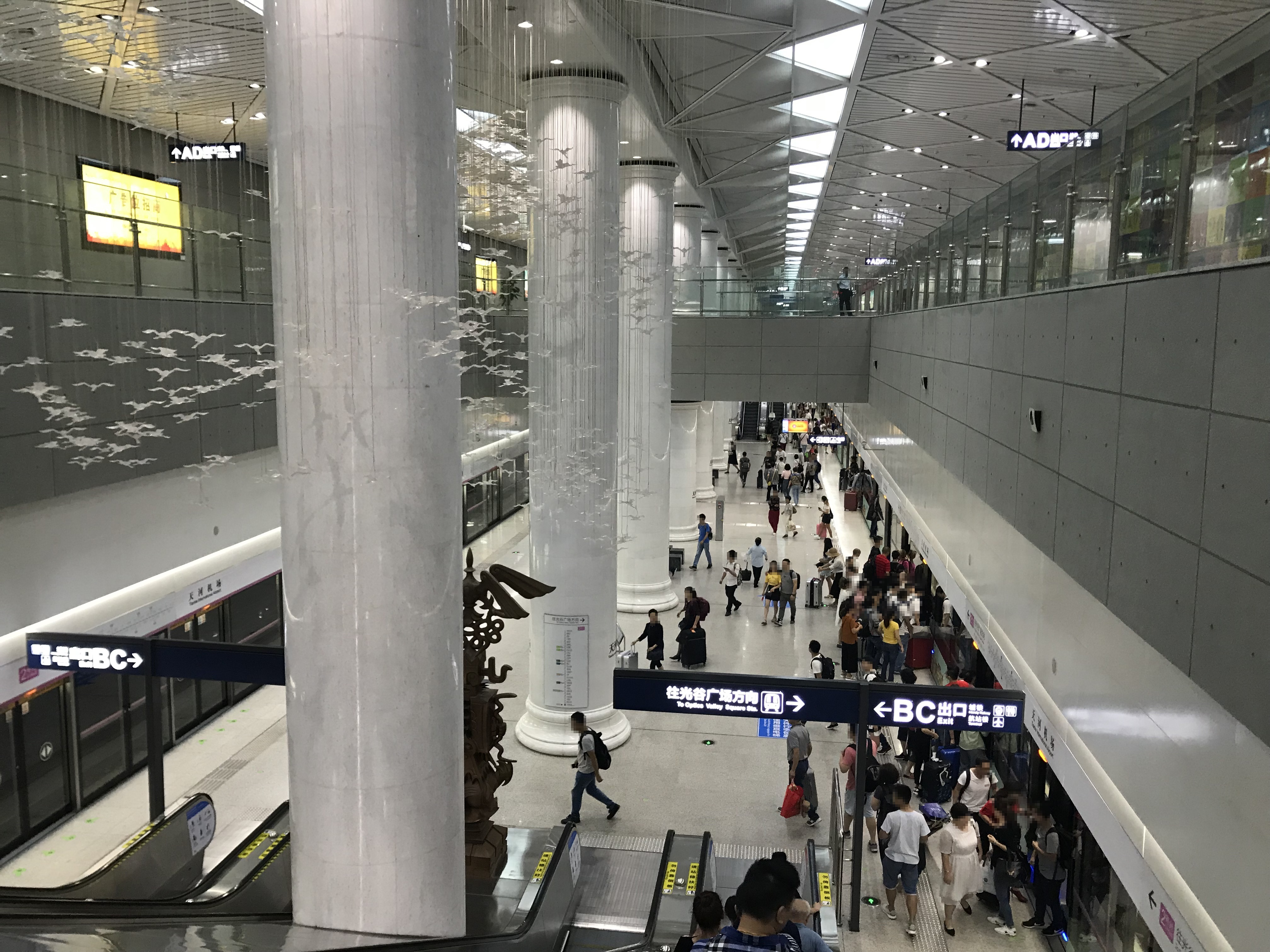
Platform
