= Tongji Hospital station =

Metro station in Wuhan, China

Coordinates: 30.4877°N 114.4605°E

Tongji Hospital 光谷同济医院 metro
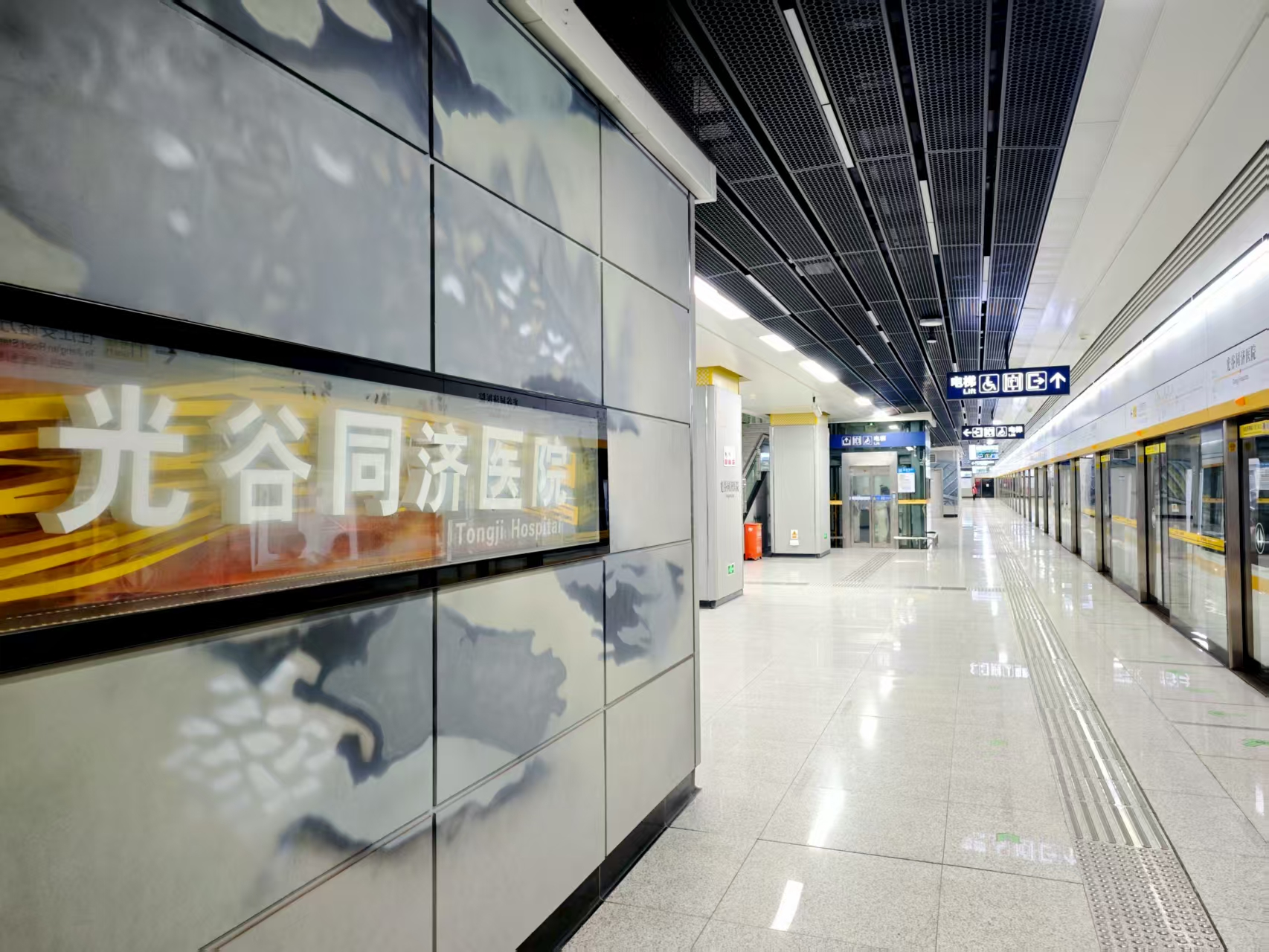
- Platform to Jiang'an Road Station

General information
- Location: Hongshan District, Wuhan, Hubei; China
- Operator: Wuhan Metro Co., Ltd
- Line: Line 11
- Platforms: 2 (1 island platform)

Construction
- Structure type: Underground

History
- Opened: October 1, 2018 (Line 11)

Services
Preceding station	Wuhan Metro	Following station
Hukou towards Jiang'an Road	Line 11	Guanggushengwuyuan towards Gediannan Railway Station
Location

Tongji Hospital Station (Chinese: 光谷同济医院站) is a station on Line 11 of the Wuhan Metro. It entered revenue service on October 1, 2018. It is located in Hongshan District.

== Station layout ==
G	Entrances and Exits	Exits A-D
B1	Concourse	Faregates, Station Agent
B2	Westbound	← Line 11 towards Jiang'an Road (Hukou)
B2	Island platform, doors will open on the left
B2	Eastbound	Line 11 towards Gediannan Railway Station (Guanggushengwuyuan) →

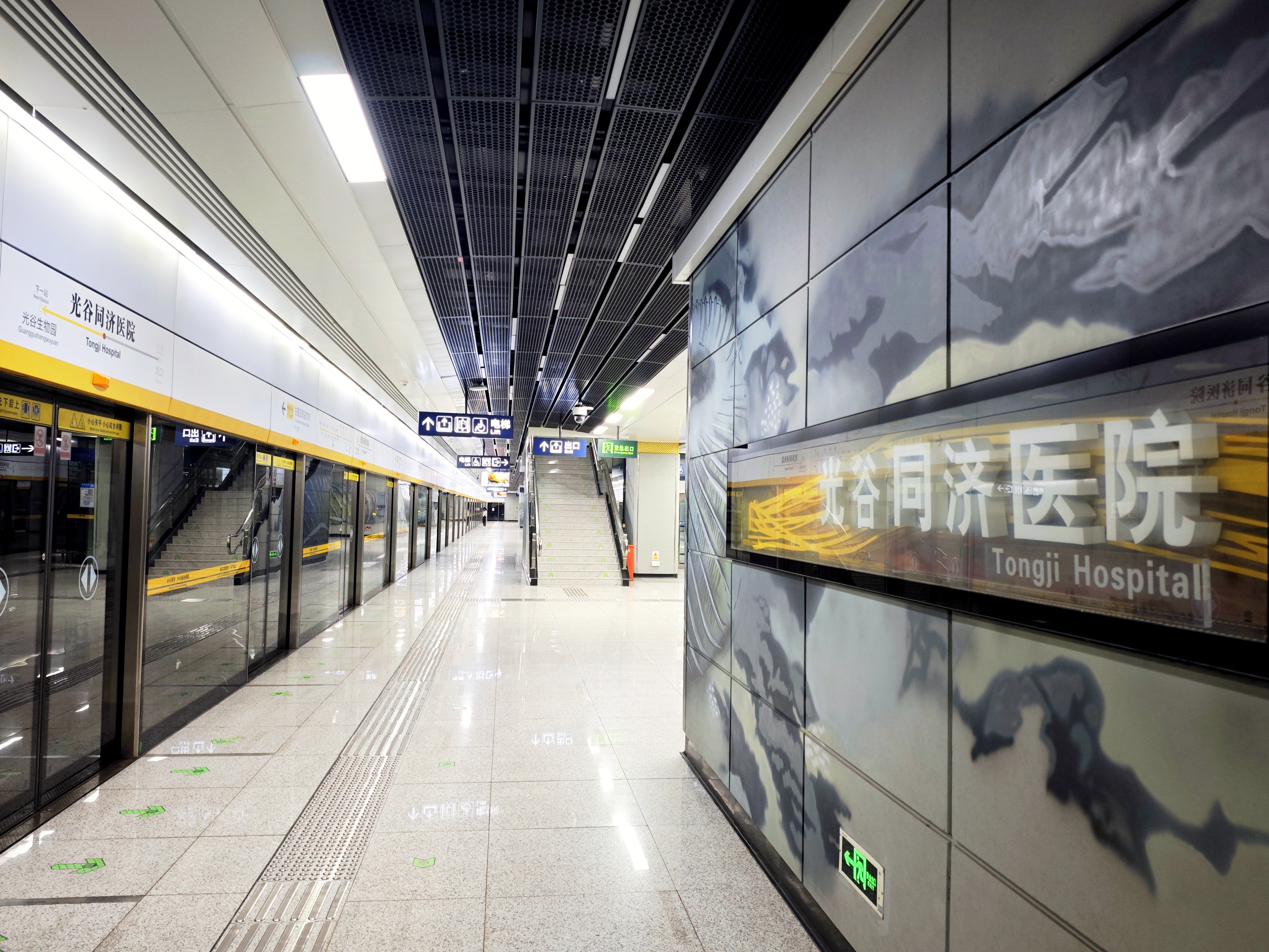
Platform to Gediannan Railway Station

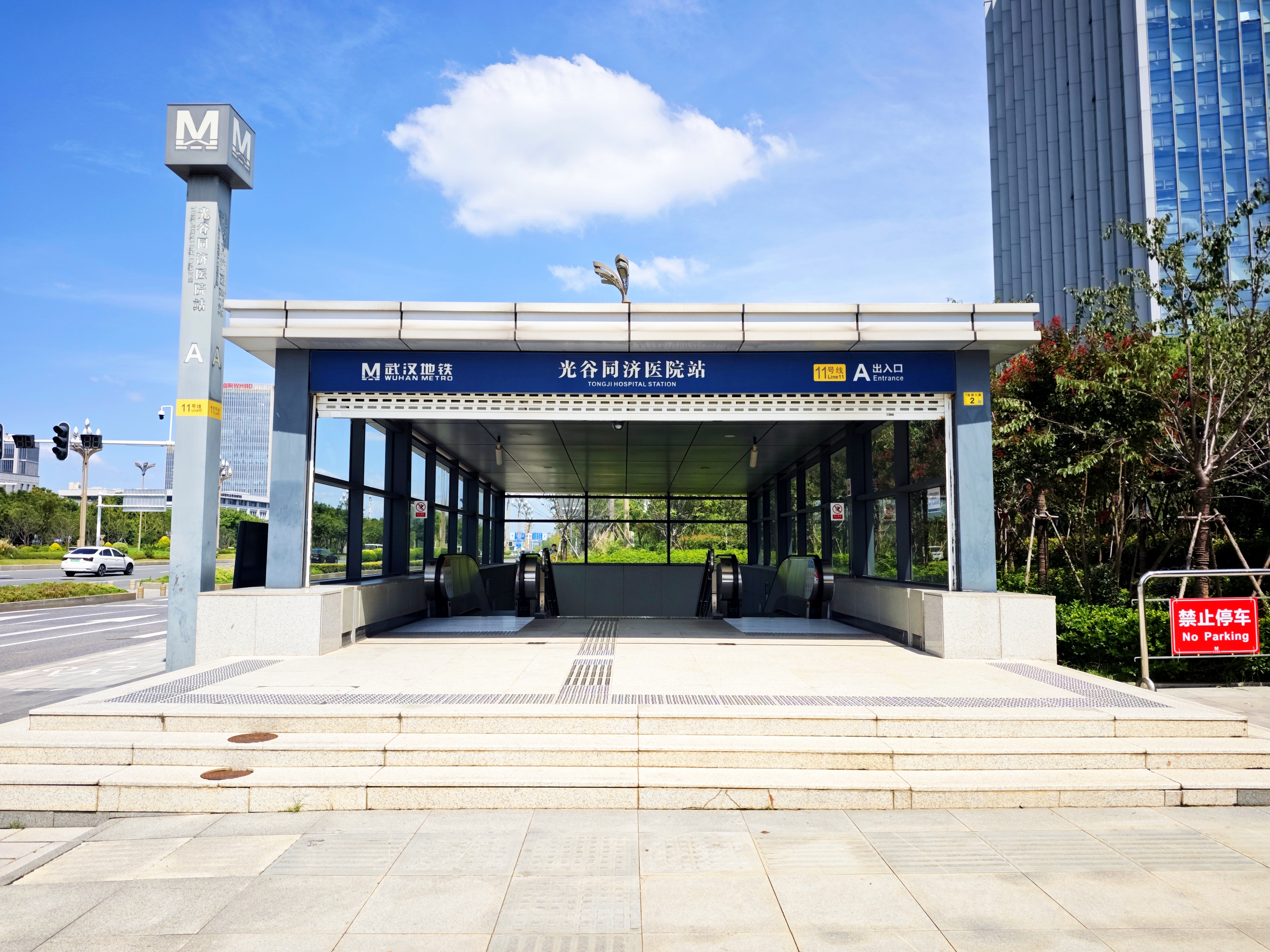
Exit A

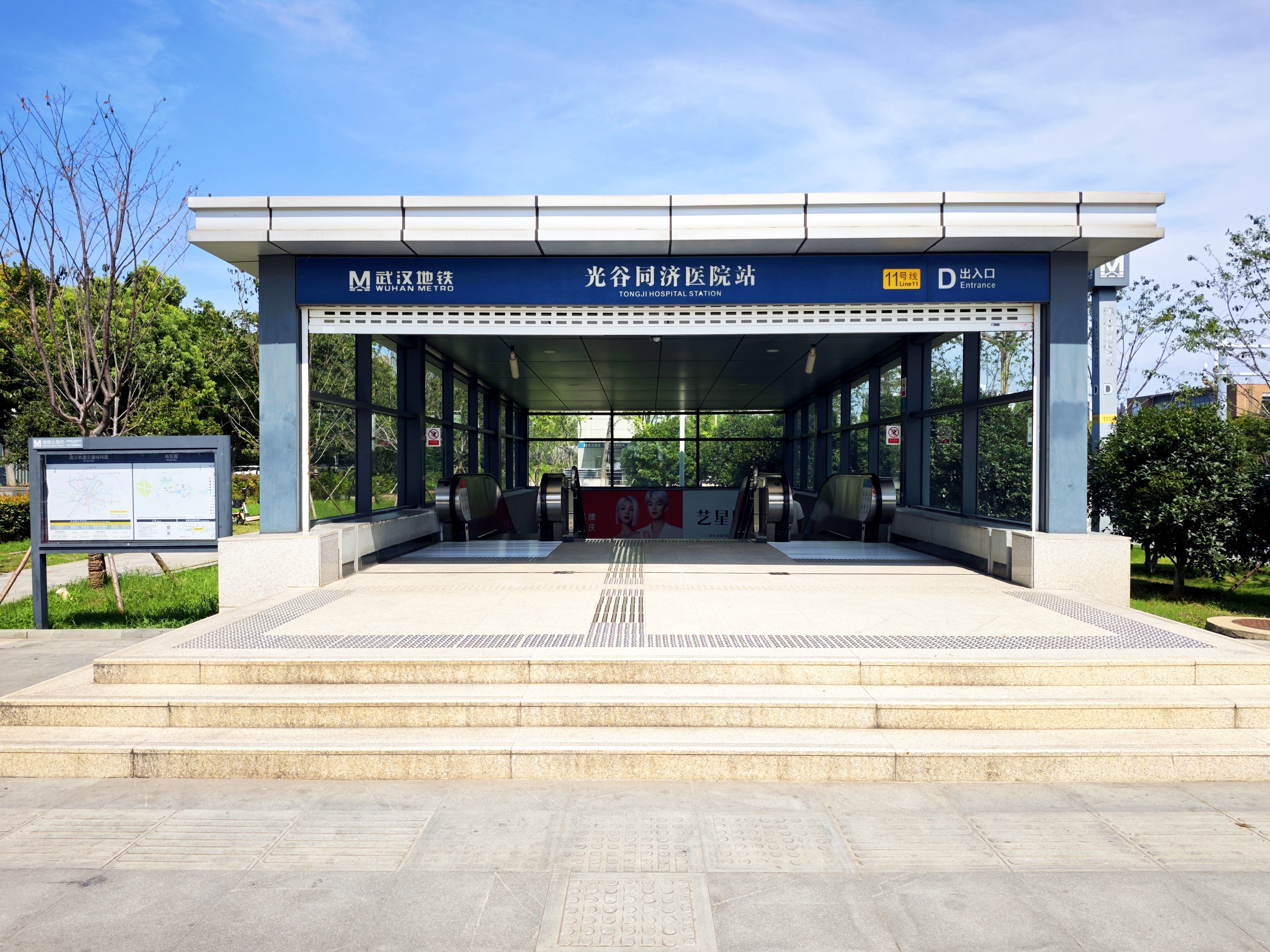
Exit D
