= Guanggushengwuyuan station =

Metro station in Wuhan, China

Guanggushengwuyuan 光谷生物园
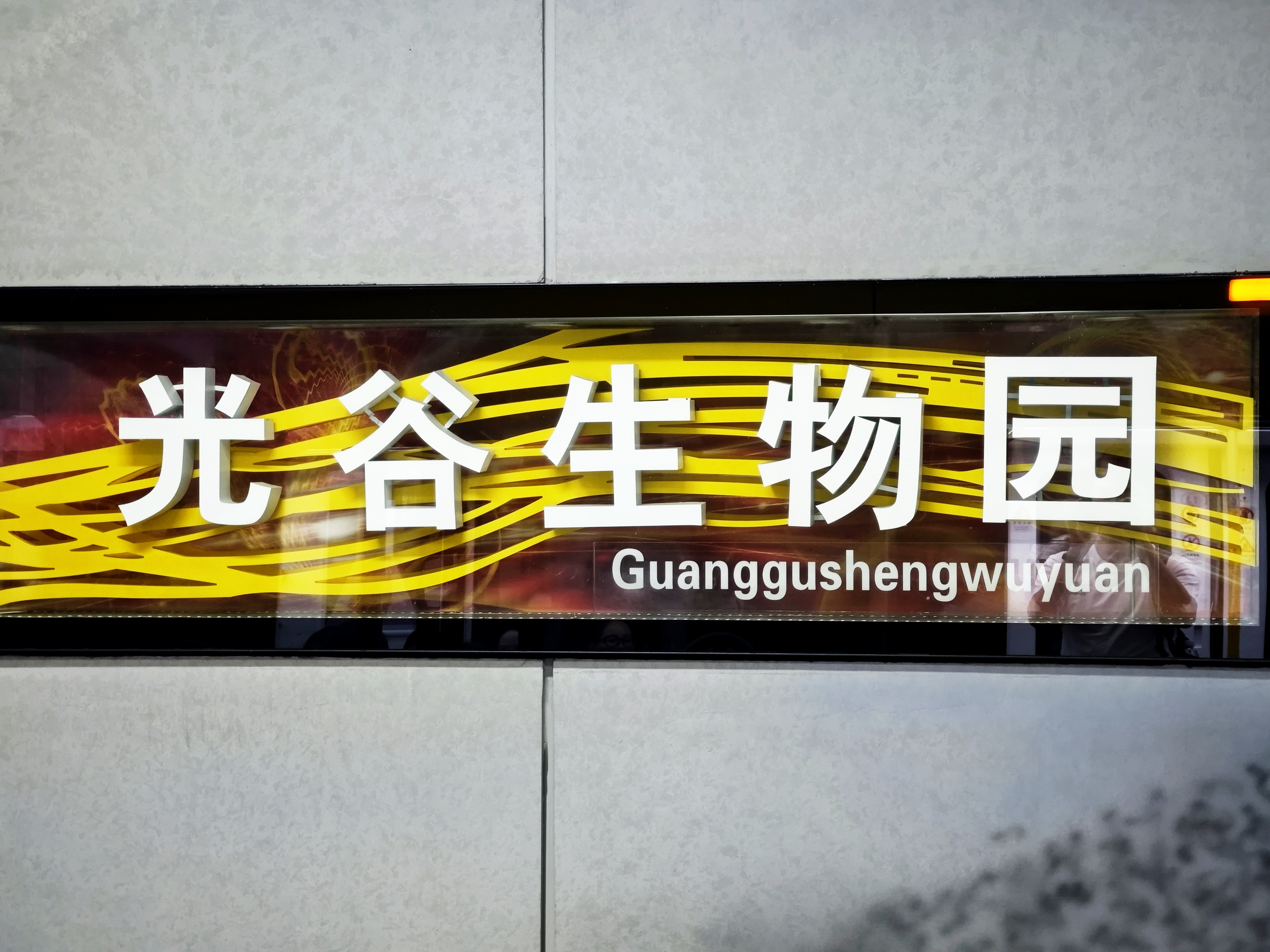

General information
- Location: Hongshan District, Wuhan, Hubei; China
- Operated by: Wuhan Metro Co., Ltd
- Line: Line 11
- Platforms: 2 (1 island platform)

Construction
- Structure type: Underground

History
- Opened: October 1, 2018 (Line 11)

Services
Preceding station	Wuhan Metro	Following station
Tongji Hospital towards Jiang'an Road	Line 11	Guanggu 4th Road towards Gediannan Railway Station
Location

Guanggushengwuyuan Station (Chinese: 光谷生物园站) is a station on Line 11 of the Wuhan Metro. It entered revenue service on October 1, 2018. It is located in Hongshan District.

== Station layout ==
G	Entrances and Exits	Exits A-E
B1	Concourse	Faregates, Station Agent
B2	Westbound	← Line 11 towards Jiang'an Road (Tongji Hospital)
B2	Island platform, doors will open on the left
B2	Eastbound	Line 11 towards Gediannan Railway Station (Guanggu 4th Road) →
