= Hukou station =

Metro station in Wuhan, China

Hukou 湖口 metro

General information
- Location: Jiangxia District, Wuhan, Hubei; China
- Coordinates: 30.49087°N 114.44099°E
- Operated by: Wuhan Metro Co., Ltd
- Line: Line 11
- Platforms: 2 (1 island platform)

Construction
- Structure type: Underground

History
- Opened: October 1, 2018 (Line 11)

Services
Preceding station	Wuhan Metro	Following station
Wuhandong Railway Station towards Jiang'an Road	Line 11	Tongji Hospital towards Gediannan Railway Station
Location

Hukou Station (Chinese: 湖口站) is a station on Line 11 of the Wuhan Metro. It entered revenue service on October 1, 2018. It is located in Jiangxia District.

== Station layout ==
G	Entrances and Exits	Exits A-H, J-L
B1	Concourse	Faregates, Station Agent
B2	Westbound	← Line 11 towards Jiang'an Road (Wuhandong Railway Station)
B2	Island platform, doors will open on the left
B2	Eastbound	Line 11 towards Gediannan Railway Station (Tongji Hospital) →
