= Weilai 1st Road station =

Metro station in Wuhan, China

Weilai 1st Road 未来一路 metro
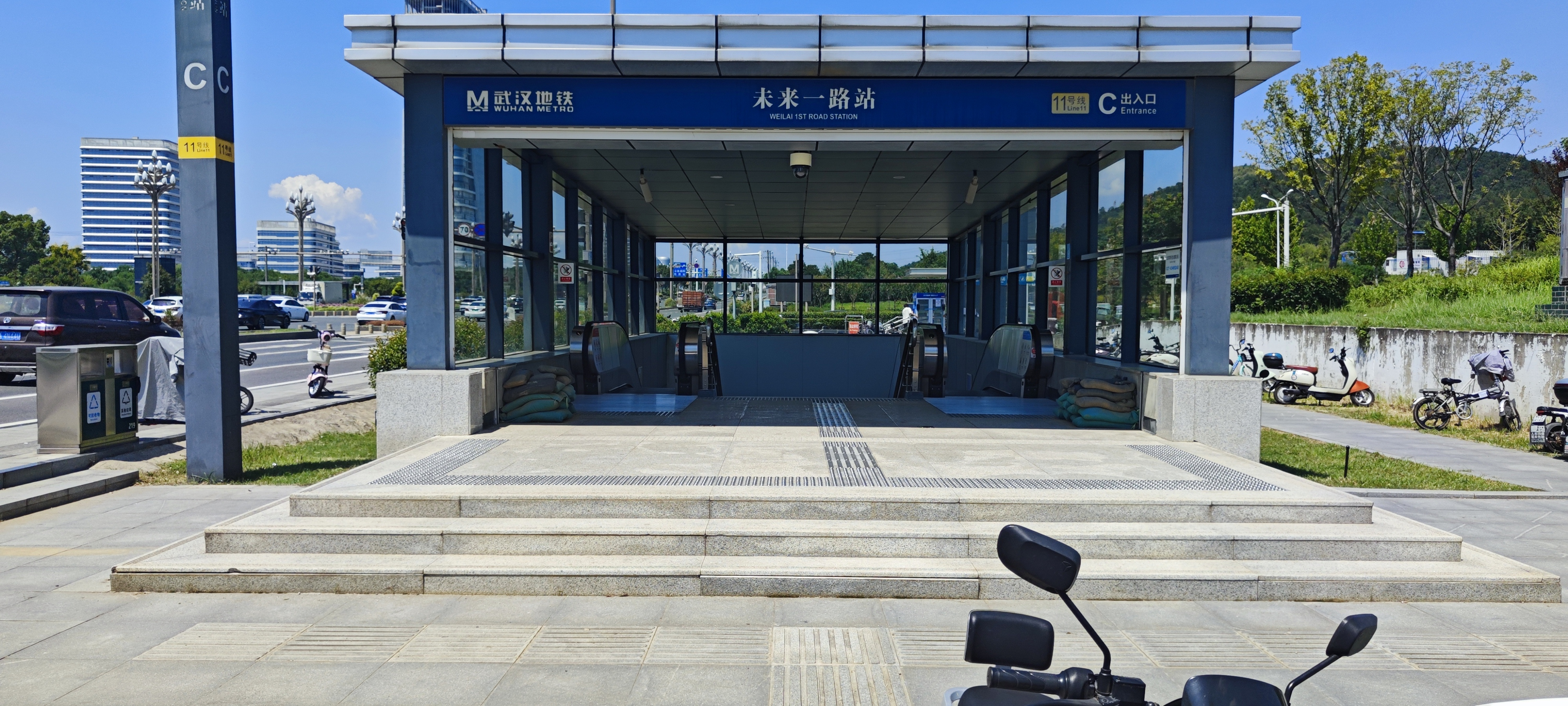
- Entrance C

General information
- Location: Jiangxia District, Wuhan, Hubei; China
- Operated by: Wuhan Metro Co., Ltd
- Line: Line 11
- Platforms: 2 (1 island platform)

Construction
- Structure type: Underground

History
- Opened: October 1, 2018 (Line 11)

Services
Preceding station	Wuhan Metro	Following station
Changlingshan towards Jiang'an Road	Line 11	Weilai 3rd Road towards Gediannan Railway Station
Location

Weilai 1st Road Station (Chinese: 未来一路站) is a station on Line 11 of the Wuhan Metro. It entered revenue service on October 1, 2018. It is located in Jiangxia District.

== Station layout ==
G	Entrances and Exits	Exits A-D
B1	Concourse	Faregates, Station Agent
B2	Westbound	← Line 11 towards Jiang'an Road (Changlingshan)
B2	Island platform, doors will open on the left
B2	Eastbound	Line 11 towards Gediannan Railway Station (Weilai 3rd Road) →
