= Guanggu 5th Road station =

Metro station in Wuhan, China

Guanggu 5th Road 光谷五路 metro
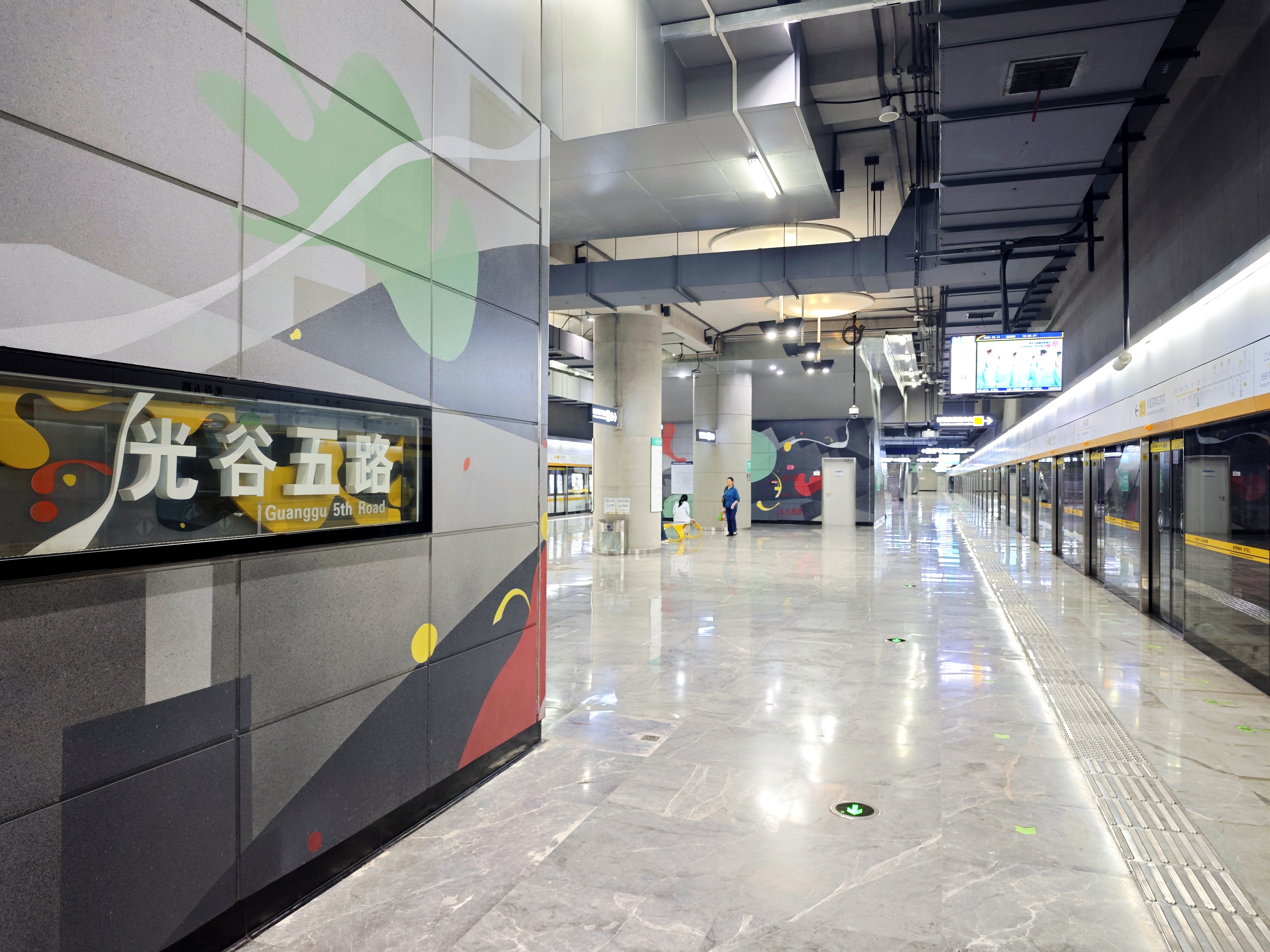
- Platform to Gediannan Railway Station, Guanggu 5th Road Station

General information
- Location: Hongshan District, Wuhan, Hubei; China
- Coordinates: 30.4876°N 114.4975°E
- Operated by: Wuhan Metro Co., Ltd
- Lines: Line 11; Line 19
- Platforms: 4

Construction
- Structure type: Underground

History
- Opened: October 1, 2018 (Line 11); December 30, 2023 (Line 19)

Services
Preceding station	Wuhan Metro	Following station
Guanggu 4th Road towards Jiang'an Road	Line 11	Guanggu 6th Road towards Gediannan Railway Station
Huashanhe towards West Square of Wuhan Railway Station	Line 19	Xinyuexi Park Terminus
Location

Guanggu 5th Road Station (Chinese: 光谷五路站), is a station on Line 11 and Line 19 of the Wuhan Metro. It entered revenue service on October 1, 2018. It is located in Hongshan District.

The station became an interchange station with the opening of Line 19 on December 30, 2023.

== Station layout ==
G	Entrances and Exits	Exits A-H
B1	East Concourse	Faregates, Station Agent
B1	Side platform, doors will open on the right
B1	Northbound	← Line 19 towards West Square of Wuhan Railway Station (Huashanhe)
B1	Southbound	Line 19 towards Xinyuexi Park (Terminus) →
B1	Side platform, doors will open on the right
B1	West Concourse	Faregates, Station Agent
B2	Westbound	← Line 11 towards Jiang'an Road (Guanggu 4th Road)
B2	Island platform, doors will open on the left
B2	Eastbound	Line 11 towards Gediannan Railway Station (Guanggu 6th Road) →

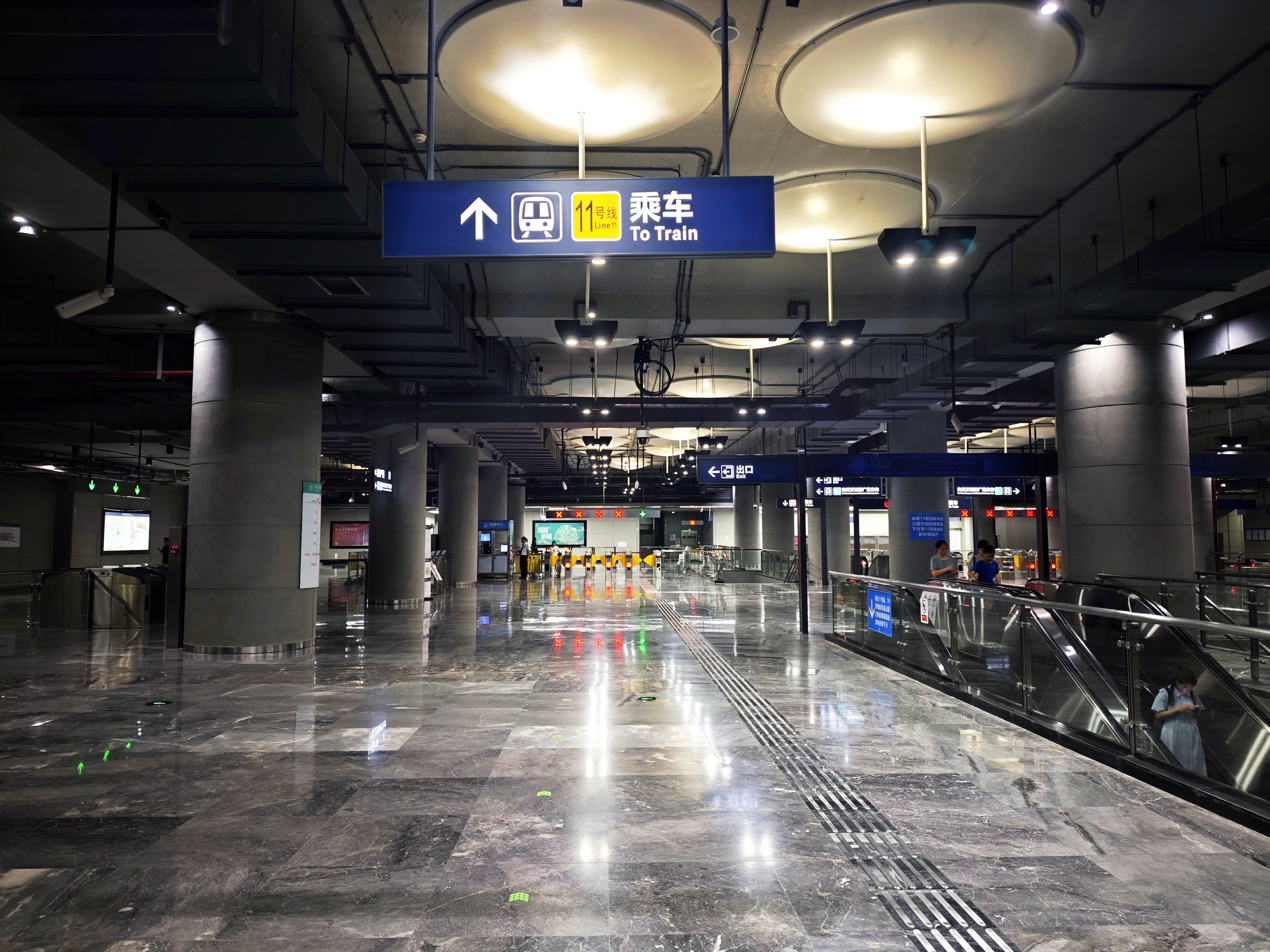
East Concourse

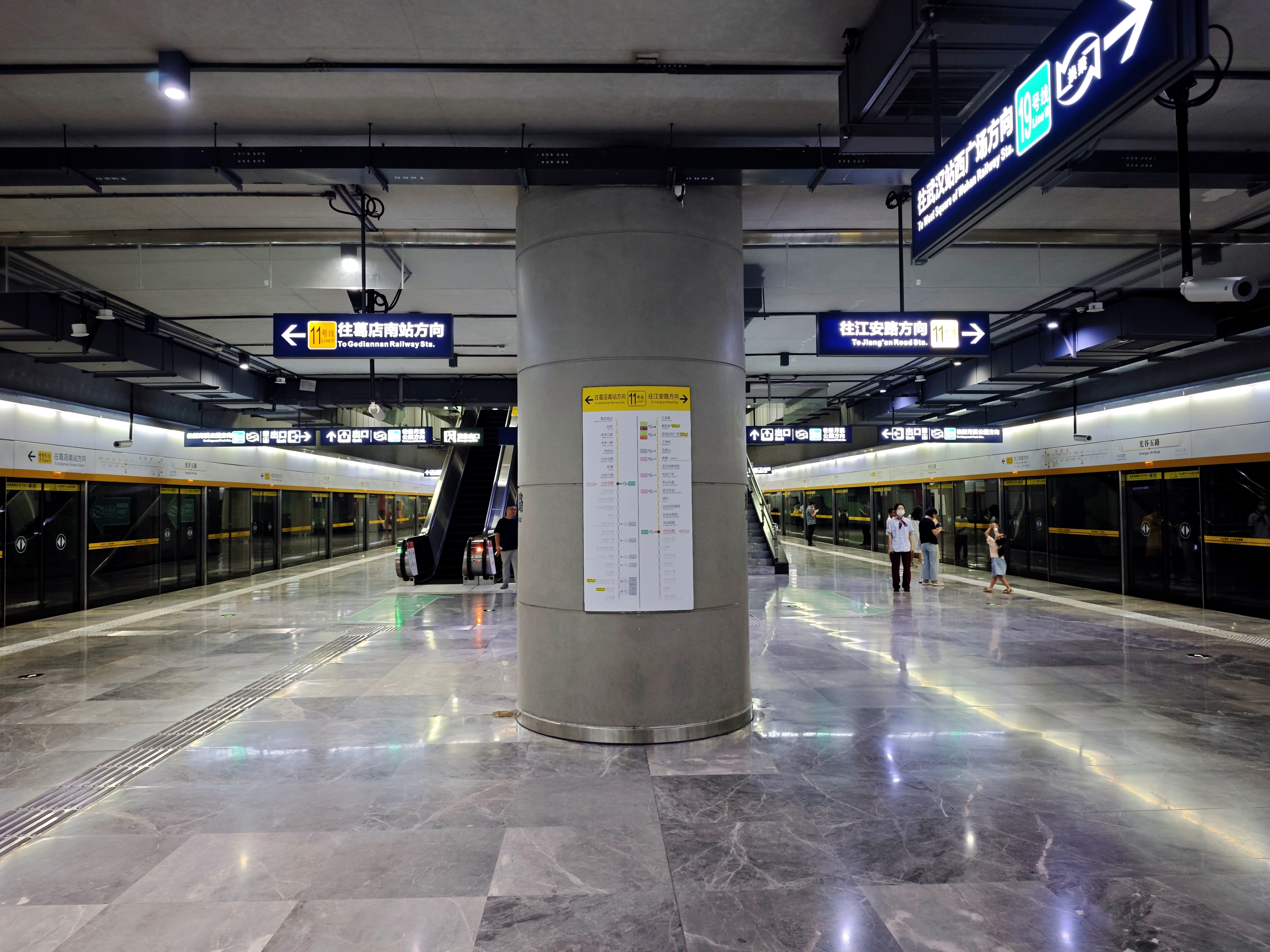
Platform of Line 11

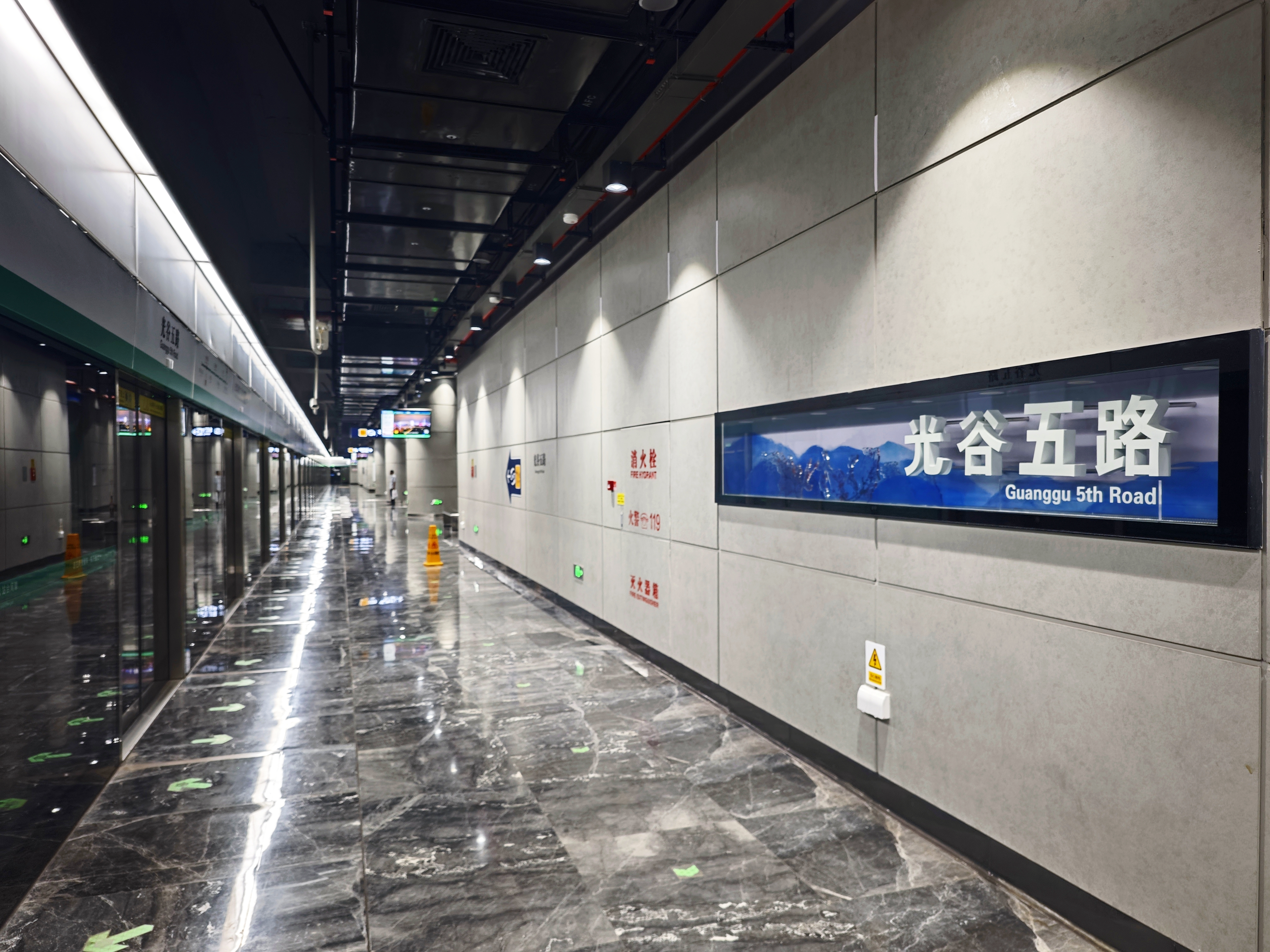
Platform of Line 19 (to West Square of Wuhan Railway Station)
