= Weilai 3rd Road station =

Metro station in Wuhan, China

Coordinates: 30.4886°N 114.6000°E

Weilai 3rd Road 未来三路 metro
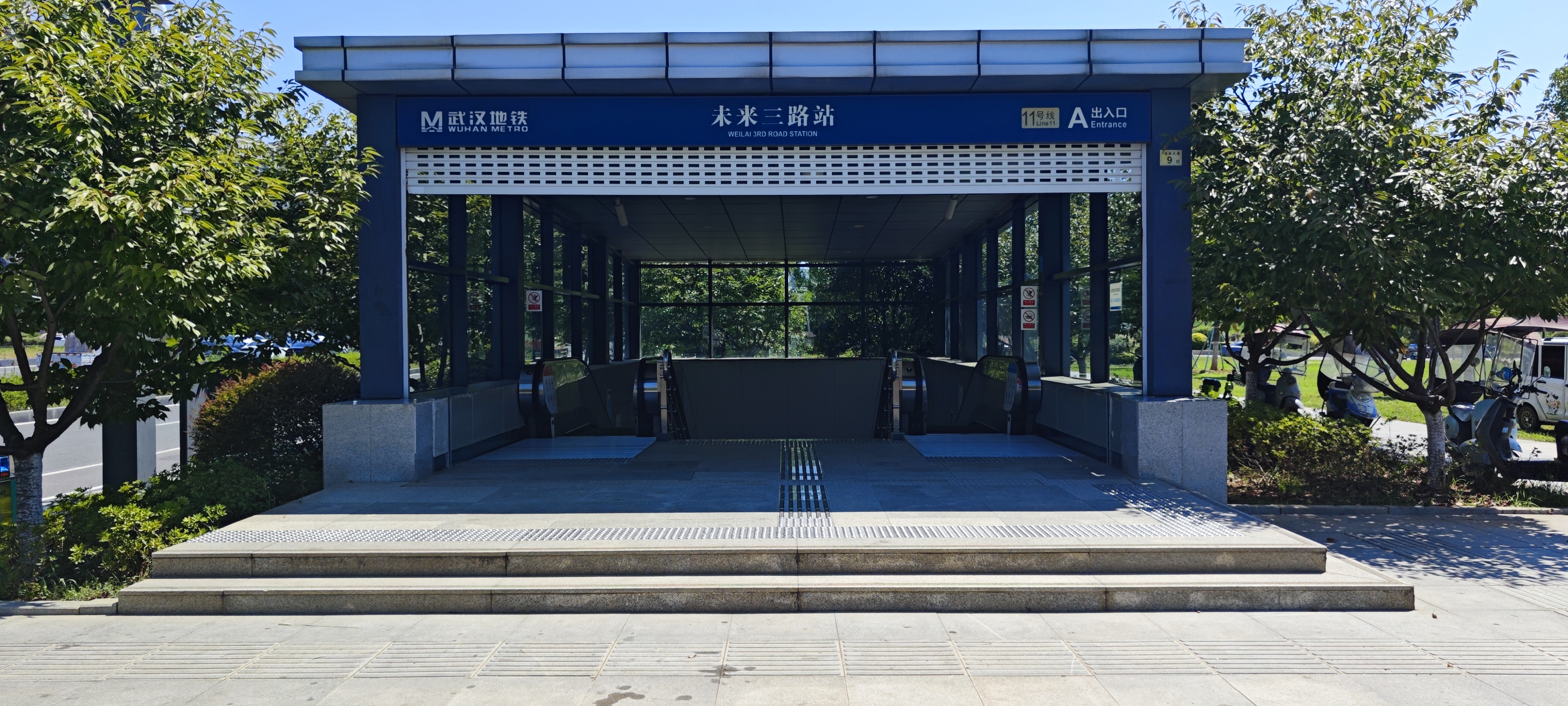
- Entrance A

General information
- Location: Hongshan District, Wuhan, Hubei; China
- Operated by: Wuhan Metro Co., Ltd
- Line: Line 11
- Platforms: 2 (1 island platform)

Construction
- Structure type: Underground

History
- Opened: October 1, 2018 (Line 11)

Services
Preceding station	Wuhan Metro	Following station
Weilai 1st Road towards Jiang'an Road	Line 11	Zuoling towards Gediannan Railway Station
Location

Weilai 3rd Road Station (Chinese: 未来三路站) is a station on Line 11 of the Wuhan Metro. It entered revenue service on October 1, 2018. It is located in Hongshan District.

== Station layout ==
G	Entrances and Exits	Exits A-D
B1	Concourse	Faregates, Station Agent
B2	Westbound	← Line 11 towards Jiang'an Road (Weilai 1st Road)
B2	Island platform, doors will open on the left
B2	Eastbound	Line 11 towards Gediannan Railway Station (Zuoling) →
