= Changlingshan station =

Metro station in Wuhan, China

Changlingshan 长岭山 metro

General information
- Location: Jiangxia District, Wuhan, Hubei; China
- Coordinates: 30.48993°N 114.55753°E
- Operated by: Wuhan Metro Co., Ltd
- Line: Line 11
- Platforms: 2 (1 island platform)

Construction
- Structure type: Underground

History
- Opened: October 1, 2018 (Line 11)

Services
Preceding station	Wuhan Metro	Following station
Guanggu 7th Road towards Jiang'an Road	Line 11	Weilai 1st Road towards Gediannan Railway Station
Location

Changlingshan Station (Chinese: 长岭山站) is a station on Line 11 of the Wuhan Metro. It entered revenue service on October 1, 2018. It is located in Jiangxia District.

== Station layout ==
G	Entrances and Exits
B1	Concourse	Faregates, Station Agent
B2	Westbound	← Line 11 towards Jiang'an Road (Guanggu 7th Road)
B2	Island platform, doors will open on the left
B2	Eastbound	Line 11 towards Gediannan Railway Station (Weilai 1st Road) →
