= Wuhan East railway station =

China Railway and Wuhan Metro station

Wuhandong Railway Station 武汉东站
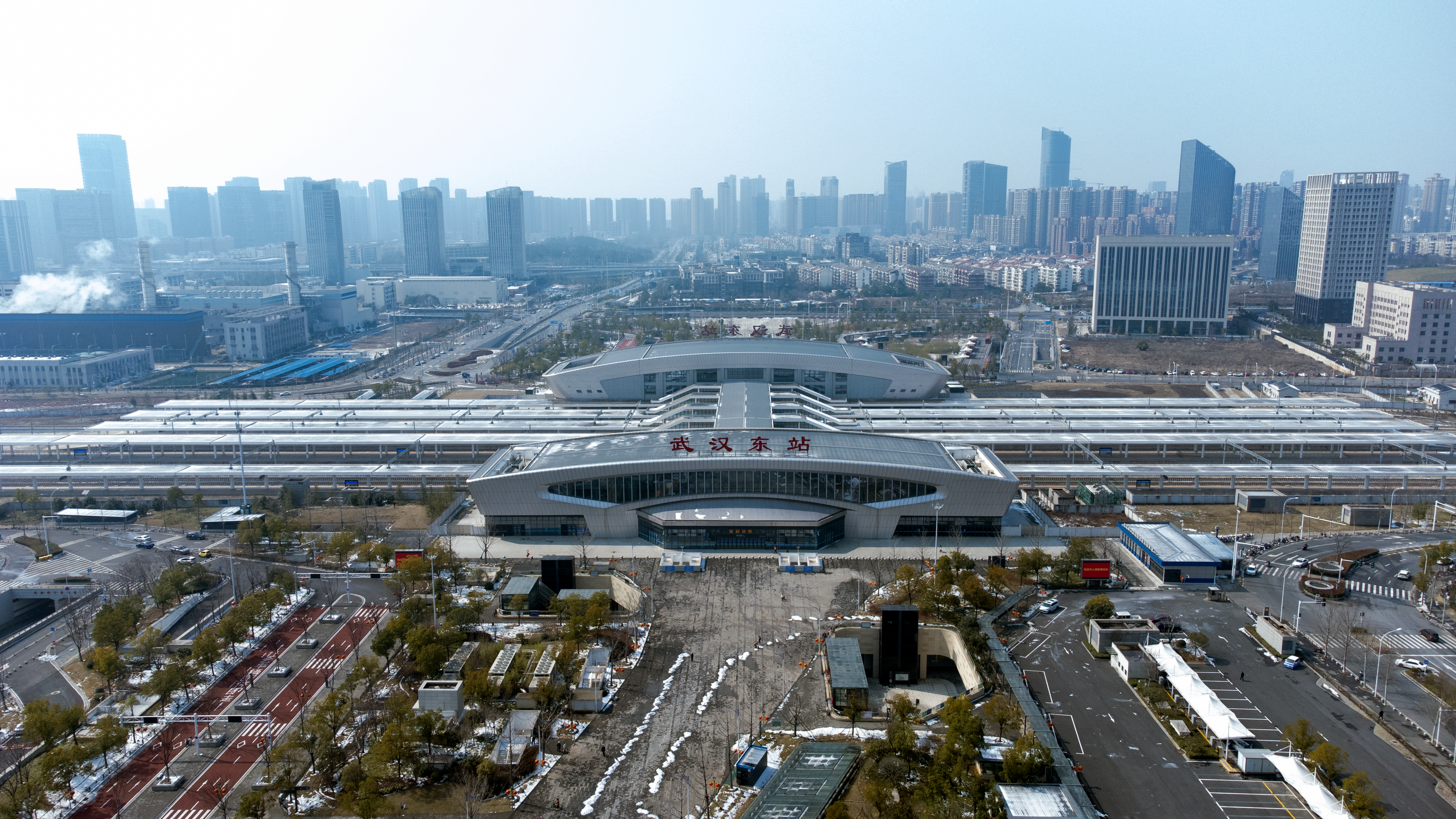

General information
- Location: Jiangxia District, Wuhan, Hubei; China
- Operator: China Railway Wuhan Group, China Railway Corporation

Other information
- Status: Operational

History
- Opened: June 1971 (Old railway station); August 12, 2022 (New railway station)
- Former names: Guanshan (关山), Guanggu (光谷), Liufang (流芳)
Location

Wuhandong railway station (Chinese: 武汉东站; pinyin: Wǔhàndōng zhàn; lit. 'Wuhan East railway station'), formerly known as Liufang railway station (Chinese: 流芳站; pinyin: Liúfāng zhàn), is a railway station located in Jiangxia District, Wuhan, Hubei Province, China. The new railway station opened on August 12, 2022. It is served by the Wuhan–Xianning intercity railway and Line 2 and Line 11 of the Wuhan Metro.

== History ==
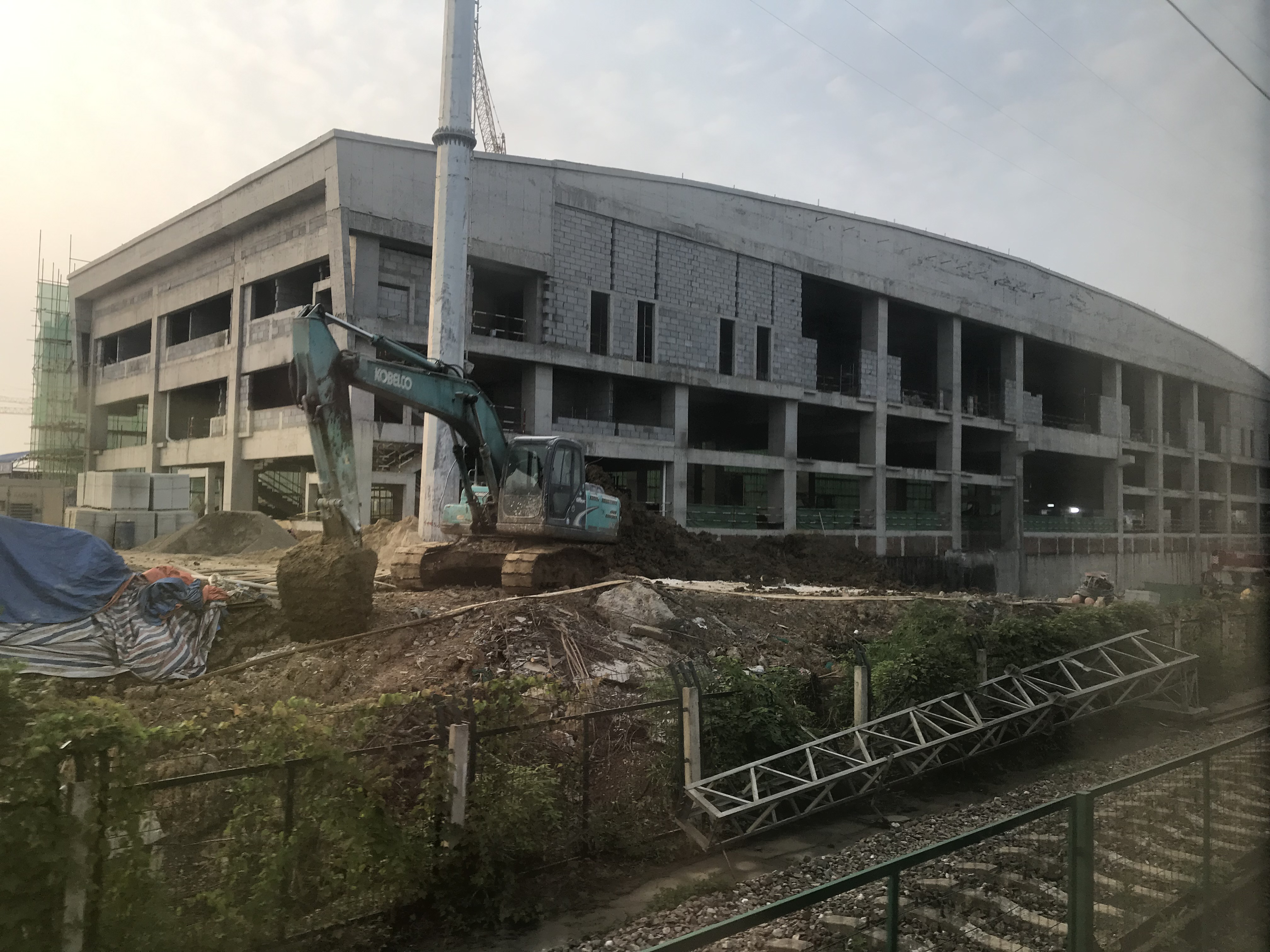
Station building under construction in June 2019

Wuhandong railway station was constructed on the former site of Liufang railway station, a goods station on the Wuchang south ring of Wuhan–Jiujiang railway.

Construction of the railway station started on July 28, 2015. And at first this new railway station was named Optics valley railway station (Chinese: 光谷火车站). It was renamed as Wuhan East railway station on August 31, 2022 according to the Rules of railway station naming.

With only the west part (intercity train) activated, the railway station opened on August 12, 2022.

== Wuhan Metro ==
Wuhandong Railway Station 武汉东站 metro
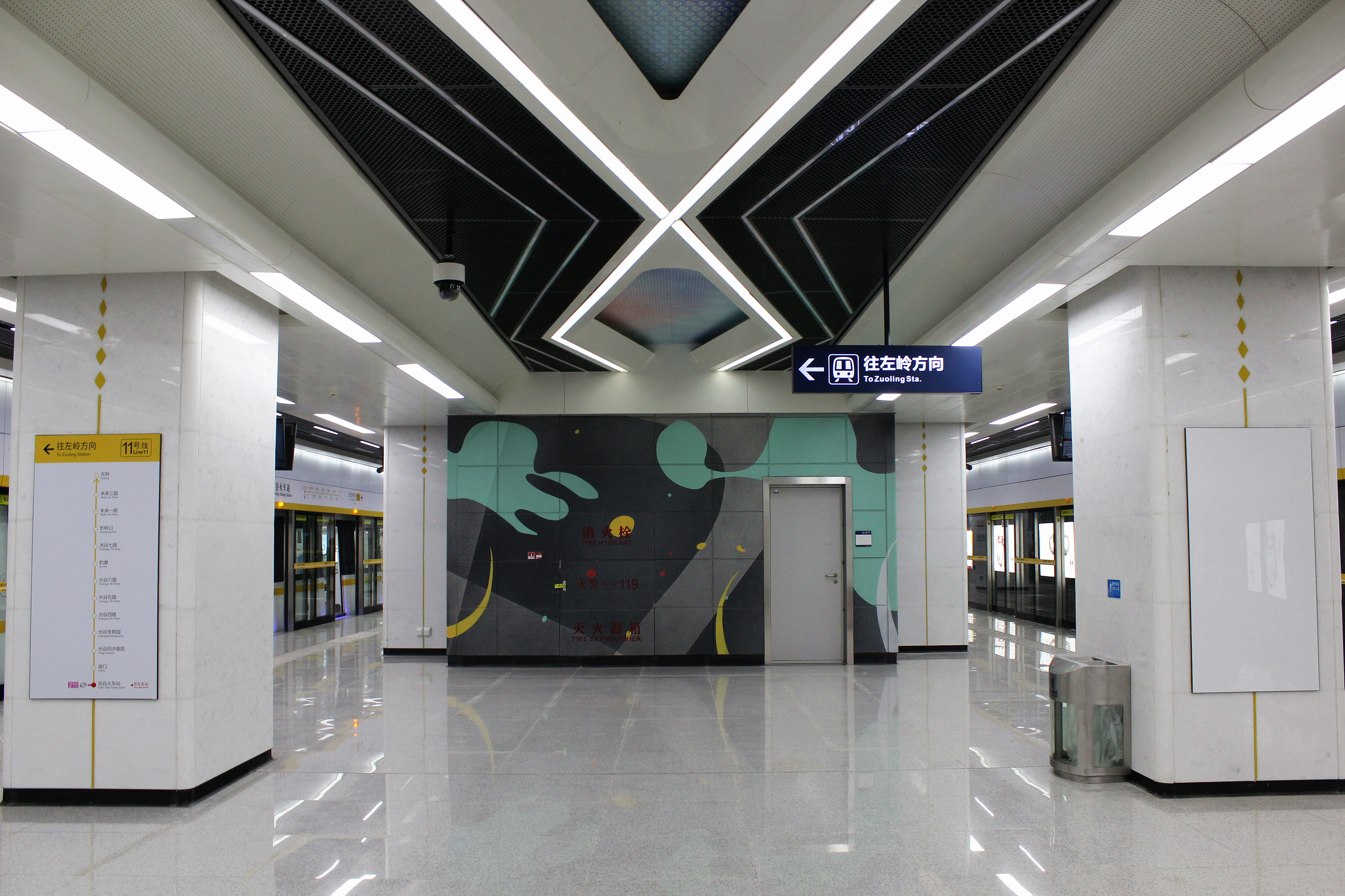
- Line 11 platform

General information
- Location: Jiangxia District, Wuhan, Hubei; China
- Operator: Wuhan Metro Co., Ltd
- Lines: Line 2 Line 11
- Platforms: 4 (2 island platforms)

Construction
- Structure type: Underground

History
- Opened: October 1, 2018 (Line 11); February 19, 2019 (Line 2)

Services
Preceding station	Wuhan Metro	Following station
Jiayuan Road towards Tianhe International Airport	Line 2	Huanglongshan Road towards Fozuling
Guanshan Boulevard towards Jiang'an Road	Line 11	Hukou towards Gediannan Railway Station
Location

Wuhandong Railway Station (Chinese: 武汉东站; pinyin: Wǔhàndōng zhàn; lit. 'Wuhan East railway station'), is a transfer station on Line 2 and Line 11 of Wuhan Metro. It entered revenue service on October 1, 2018. It is located in Jiangxia District and it serves the Wuhandong Railway Station.

=== Station layout ===
G	Entrances and Exits	Exits B-H
B1	Concourse	Faregates, Station Agent
B2	Northbound	← Line 2 towards Tianhe International Airport (Jiayuan Road)
B2	Island platform, doors will open on the left
B2	Southbound	Line 2 towards Fozuling (Huanglongshan Road) →
B3	Westbound	← Line 11 towards Jiang'an Road (Guanshan Boulevard)
B3	Island platform, doors will open on the left
B3	Eastbound	Line 11 towards Gediannan Railway Station (Hukou) →
