= Line 19 (Wuhan Metro) =

Metro line in Wuhan, China

- 19
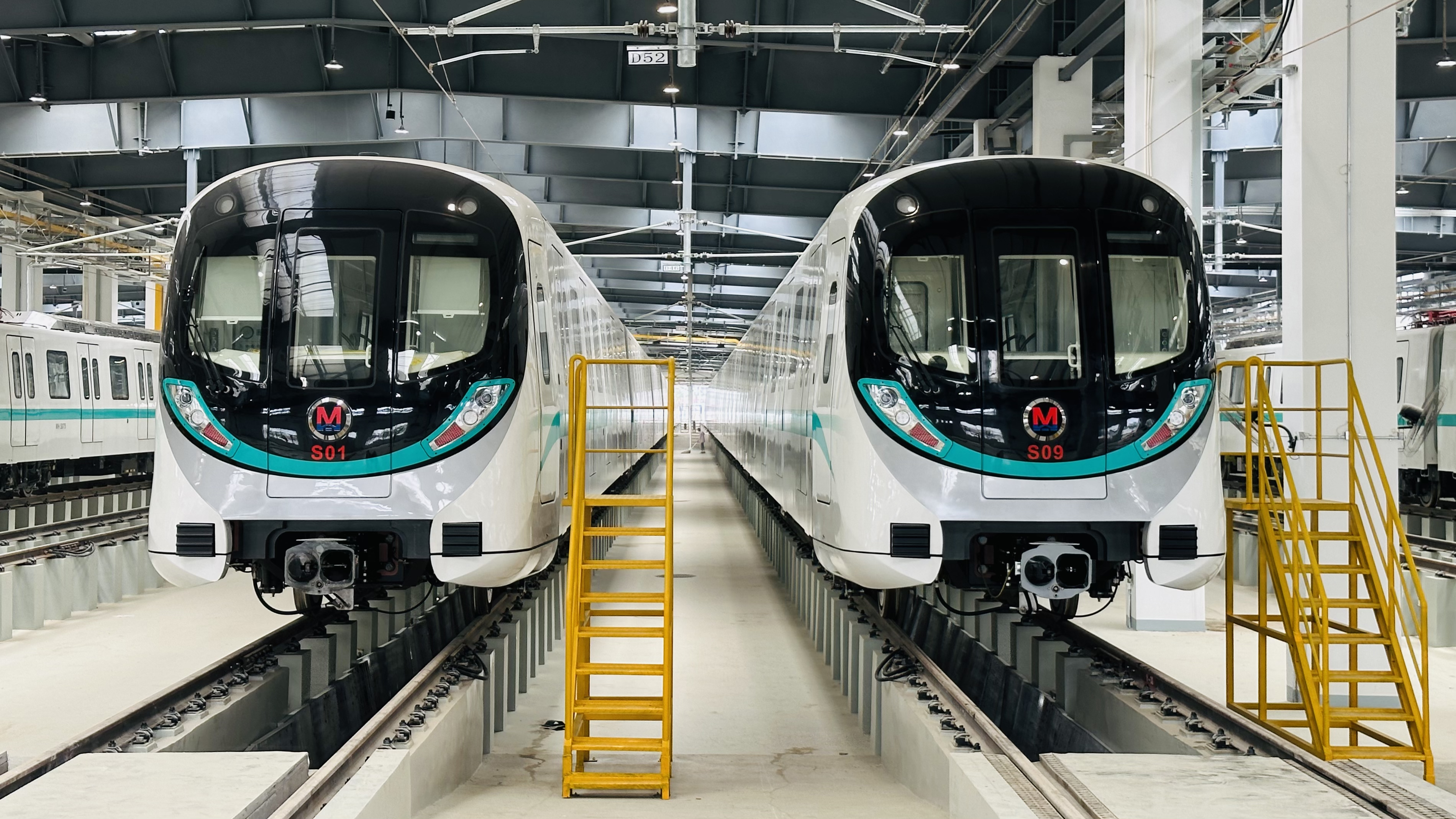
- Rolling stock used by Line 19

Overview
- Status: Operational
- Owner: Wuhan
- Locale: Wuhan, Hubei
- Termini: West Square of Wuhan Railway Station; Xinyuexi Park
- Stations: 7

Service
- Type: Rapid transit
- System: Wuhan Metro
- Services: 1
- Operator: Wuhan Metro Group Co., Ltd.
- Depot: Huashan Depot
- Rolling stock: CRRC Zhuzhou Locomotive Chinese Type A

History
- Commenced: 19 February 2019
- Opened: 30 December 2023

Technical
- Line length: 23.3 km (14.48 mi)
- Number of tracks: 2
- Character: Underground
- Track gauge: 1,435 mm (4 ft 8 1/2 in) standard gauge
- Electrification: Overhead lines (1500 volts)
- Operating speed: 120 km/h (75 mph)

Line 19 of the Wuhan Metro is a metro line in Wuhan, China. It is 23.3 kilometres (14.5 mi) long with seven stations, running between West Square of Wuhan Railway Station and Xinyuexi Park stations.

With an operating speed of 120 kilometres per hour (75 mph) and plans to increase the speed to 140 kilometres per hour (87 mph), trains on line 19 run at the highest speed within the Wuhan Metro network.

== History ==
=== Initial construction and opening ===
Line 19 was approved as part of the Wuhan Urban Rail Transit Phase 4 Construction Plan (Chinese: 武汉城市轨道交通第四期建设规划). Construction of Line 19 started on 19 February 2019, making it the first line as part of the plan to start construction.

On 30 December 2020, the first tunnel-boring machine was launched, marking the start of construction for the underground tunnels in which Line 19 will be running.

On 15 December 2022, the laying of tracks began within the completed tunnel sections of the line.

With the capping of the main structure West Square of Wuhan Railway Station station on 18 April 2023, the main structures of all seven stations along Line 19 had been completed. This was soon followed by completion of tunneling works on 23 June and the laying of tracks along the route on 28 July.

On 14 September 2023, with the supervision of the city's Municipal Quality Supervision Authority, a project acceptance meeting was held and the line passed for acceptance by Wuhan Metro. This meant that Line 19 is able to commence trial operations. The line was scheduled to commence operations within that year, and the stations were unveiled on 12 December. A safety evaluation was conducted from 17 to 20 December, with experts concluding that safety works for Line 19 were well-prepared and gave a generally-positive review.

Line 19 started operations on 30 December 2023 at 10:28 am Beijing Time (UTC+8), as announced the day prior.

=== Future extension ===
As of 2022, there are plans to extend Line 19 to Tianhe International Airport station in the future. In addition, the operating speed will be increased from 120 kilometres per hour (75 mph), which is tied with Line 16 as the fastest in the Wuhan Metro network, to 140 kilometres per hour (87 mph).

== Stations ==
The following are the list of stations which are part of Line 19.

Station name		Connections	District
English	Chinese	Connections	District
West Square of Wuhan Railway Station	武汉站西广场	4 (Note: Out of station transfer at Wuhan Railway Station) 5 (Note: Out of station transfer at East Square of Wuhan Railway Station) WS WG WHN	Hongshan
Wudong	武东		Qingshan
Gujiashan	鼓架山		Hongshan
Huashanxincheng	花山新城		Hongshan
Huashanhe	花山河		Hongshan
Guanggu 5th Road	光谷五路	11	Hongshan
Xinyuexi Park	新月溪公园	Optics Valley Tram (via Optics Valley 4th Road)	Hongshan

== Rolling stock ==
The rolling stock for Line 19 consists of 15 6-car Type-A trains, for which the tender was won by CRRC Zhuzhou Locomotive. Trains will be housed at the newly-constructed Huashan Depot. These trains will be powered by overhead wires at 1500 volts, and are capable of operating at 120 kilometres per hour (75 mph). Delivery started on 31 May 2023, with the last train being delivered by September that year.
