= Guanggu 7th Road station =

Metro station in Wuhan, China

Coordinates: 30.4800625°N 114.5339375°E

Guanggu 7th Road 光谷七路 metro
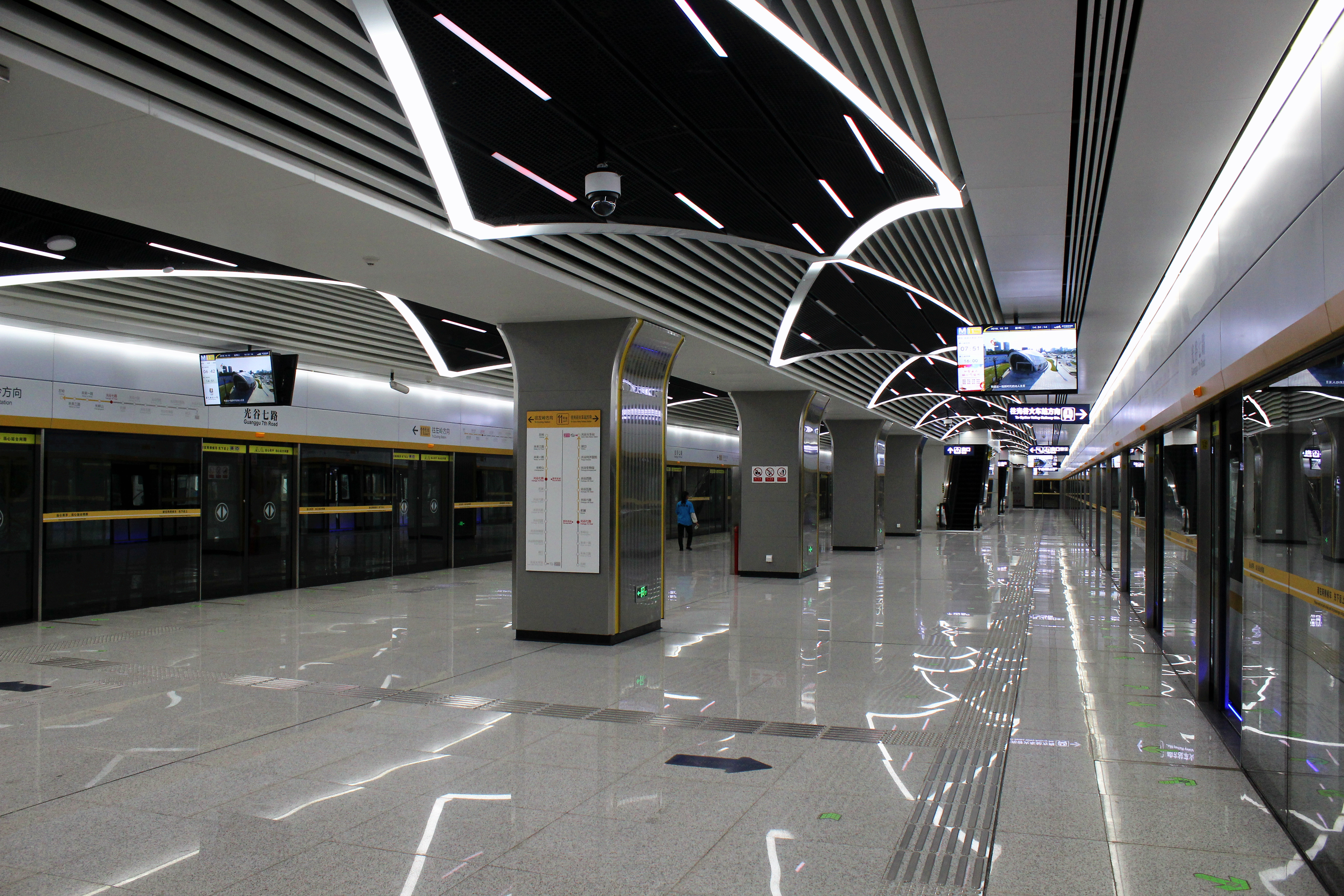

General information
- Location: Jiangxia District, Wuhan, Hubei; China
- Operated by: Wuhan Metro Co., Ltd
- Line: Line 11
- Platforms: 2 (1 island platform)

Construction
- Structure type: Underground

History
- Opened: 1 October 2018 (Line 11)

Services
Preceding station	Wuhan Metro	Following station
Baoxie towards Jiang'an Road	Line 11	Changlingshan towards Gediannan Railway Station
Location

Guanggu 7th Road Station (Chinese: 光谷七路站) is a station on Line 11 of the Wuhan Metro. It entered revenue service on 1 October 2018. It is located in Jiangxia District.

== Station layout ==
G	Entrances and Exits	Exits A-F
B1	Concourse	Faregates, Station Agent
B2	Westbound	← Line 11 towards Jiang'an Road (Baoxie)
B2	Island platform, doors will open on the left
B2	Eastbound	Line 11 towards Gediannan Railway Station (Changlingshan) →

== Gallery ==
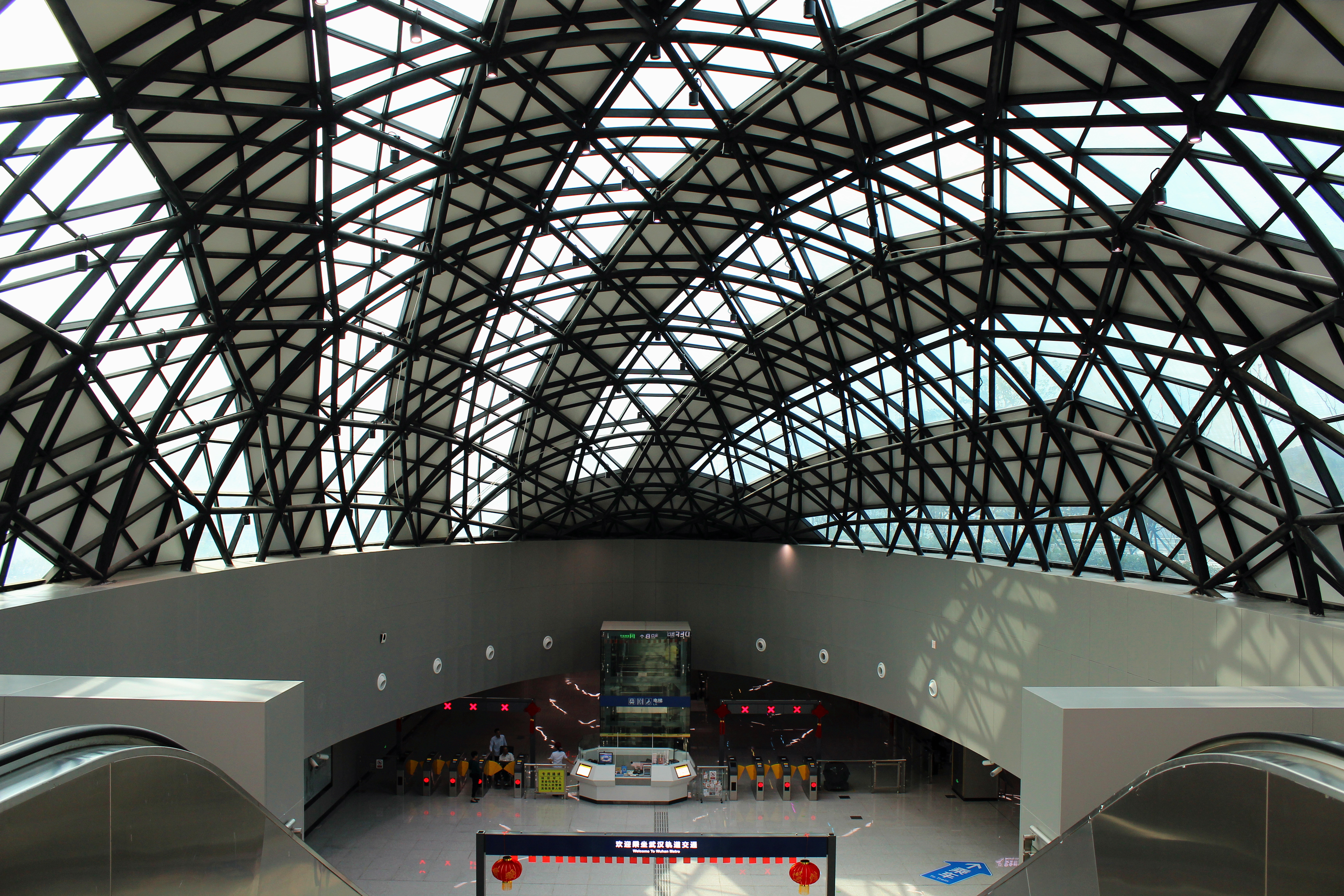
Concourse

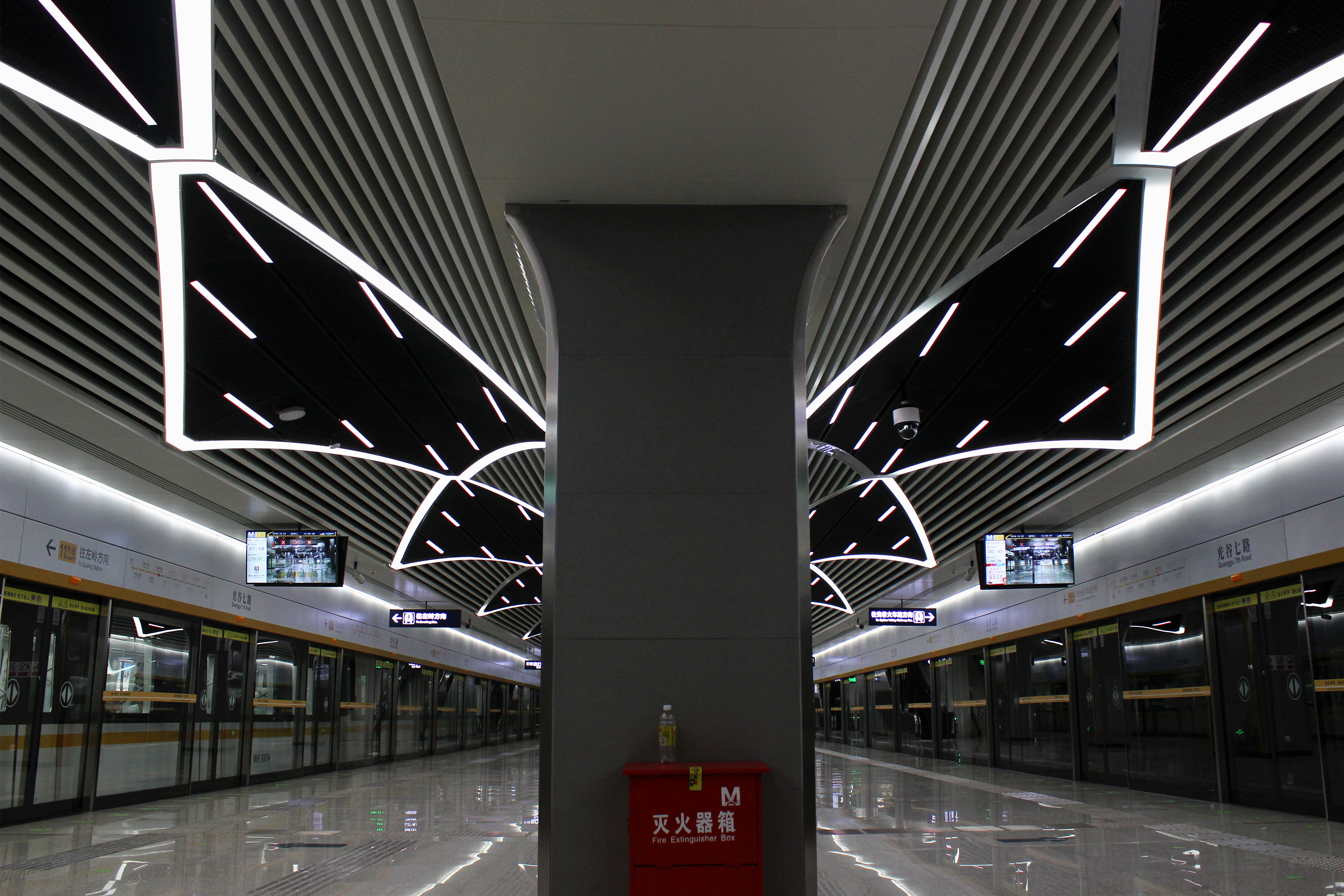
Platform
