= Guanggu 4th Road station =

Metro station in Wuhan, China

Guanggu 4th Road 光谷四路 11
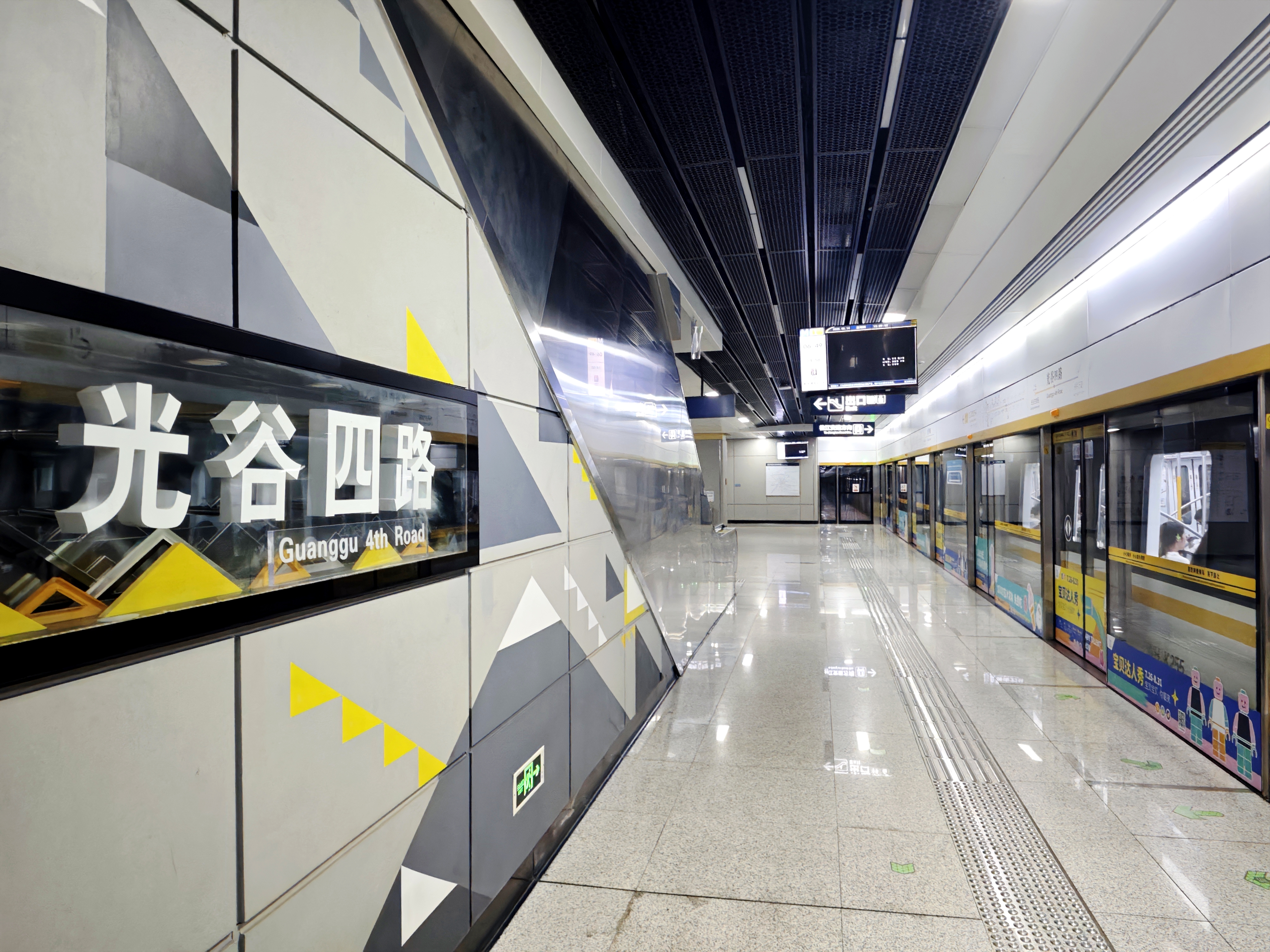
- Platform to Jiang'an Road Station

General information
- Location: Hongshan District, Wuhan, Hubei; China
- Operated by: Wuhan Metro Co., Ltd
- Line: Line 11
- Platforms: 2 (1 island platform)

Construction
- Structure type: Underground

History
- Opened: October 1, 2018 (Line 11)

Services
Preceding station	Wuhan Metro	Following station
Guanggushengwuyuan towards Jiang'an Road	Line 11	Guanggu 5th Road towards Gediannan Railway Station
Location

Guanggu 4th Road Station (Chinese: 光谷四路站) is a station on Line 11 of the Wuhan Metro. It entered revenue service on October 1, 2018. It is located in Hongshan District.

== Station layout ==
G	Entrances and Exits	Exits A-D
B1	Concourse	Faregates, Station Agent
B2	Westbound	← Line 11 towards Jiang'an Road (Guanggushengwuyuan)
B2	Island platform, doors will open on the left
B2	Eastbound	Line 11 towards Gediannan Railway Station (Guanggu 5th Road) →

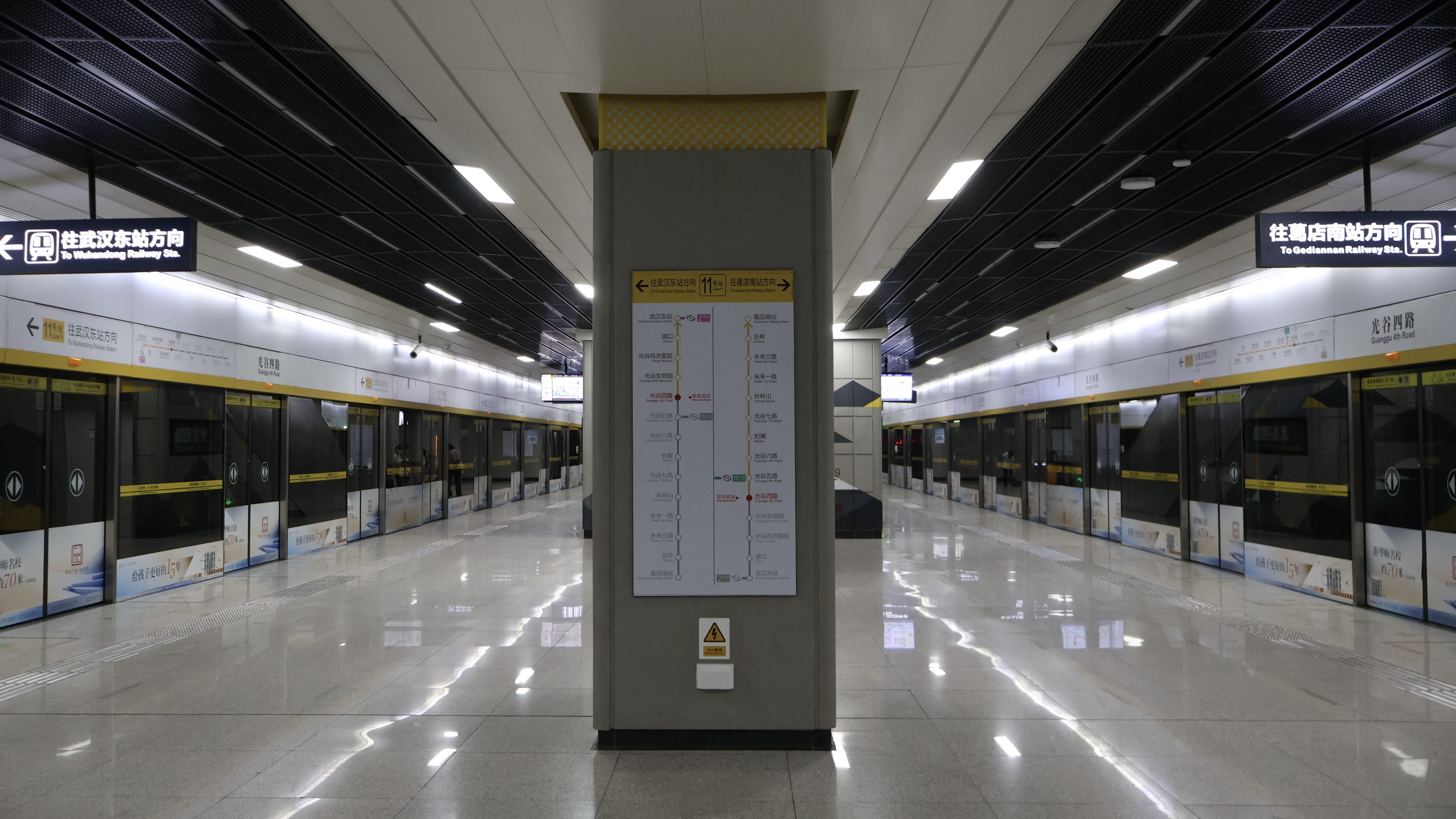
Platforms

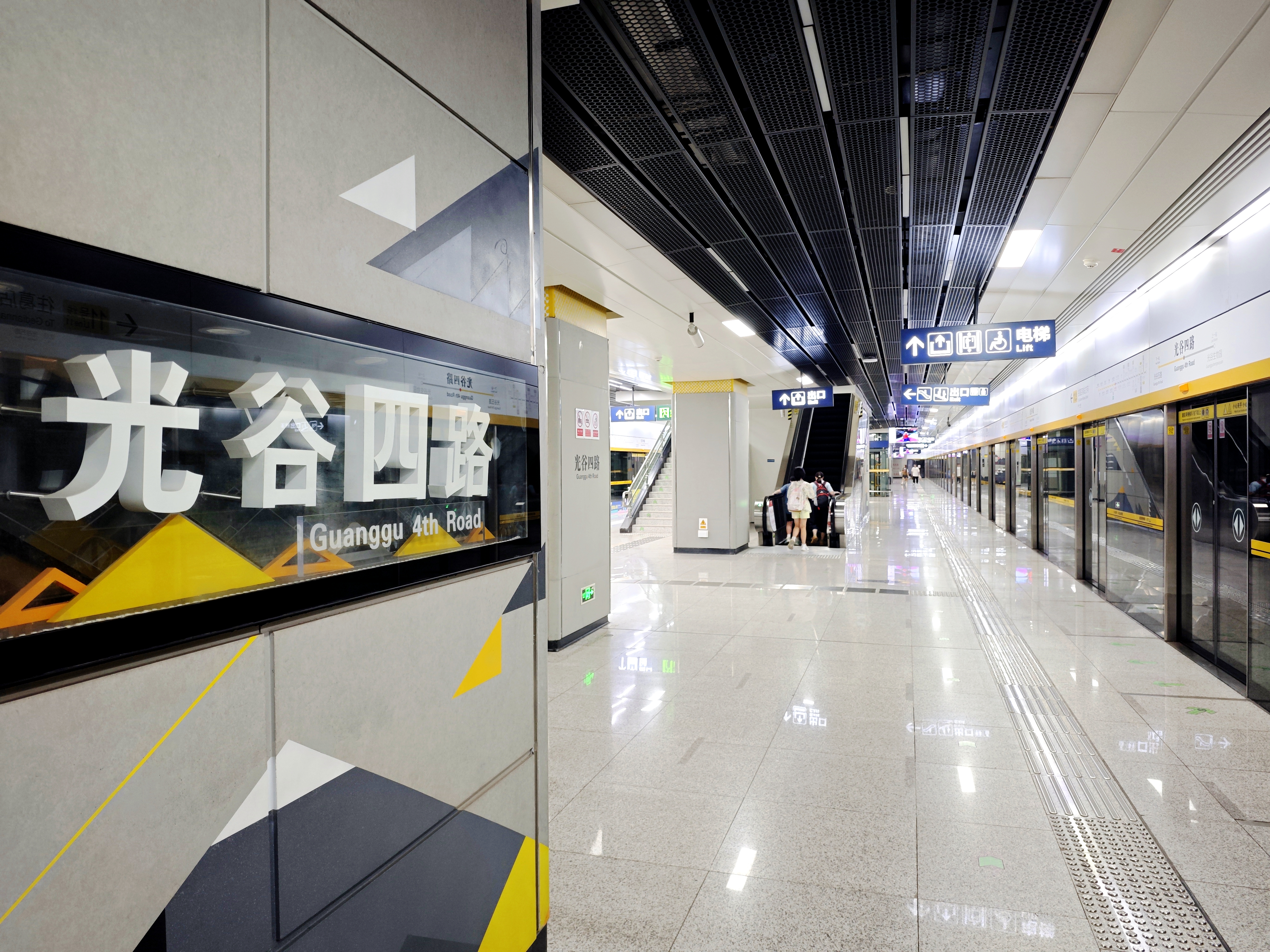
Platform to Gediannan Railway Station

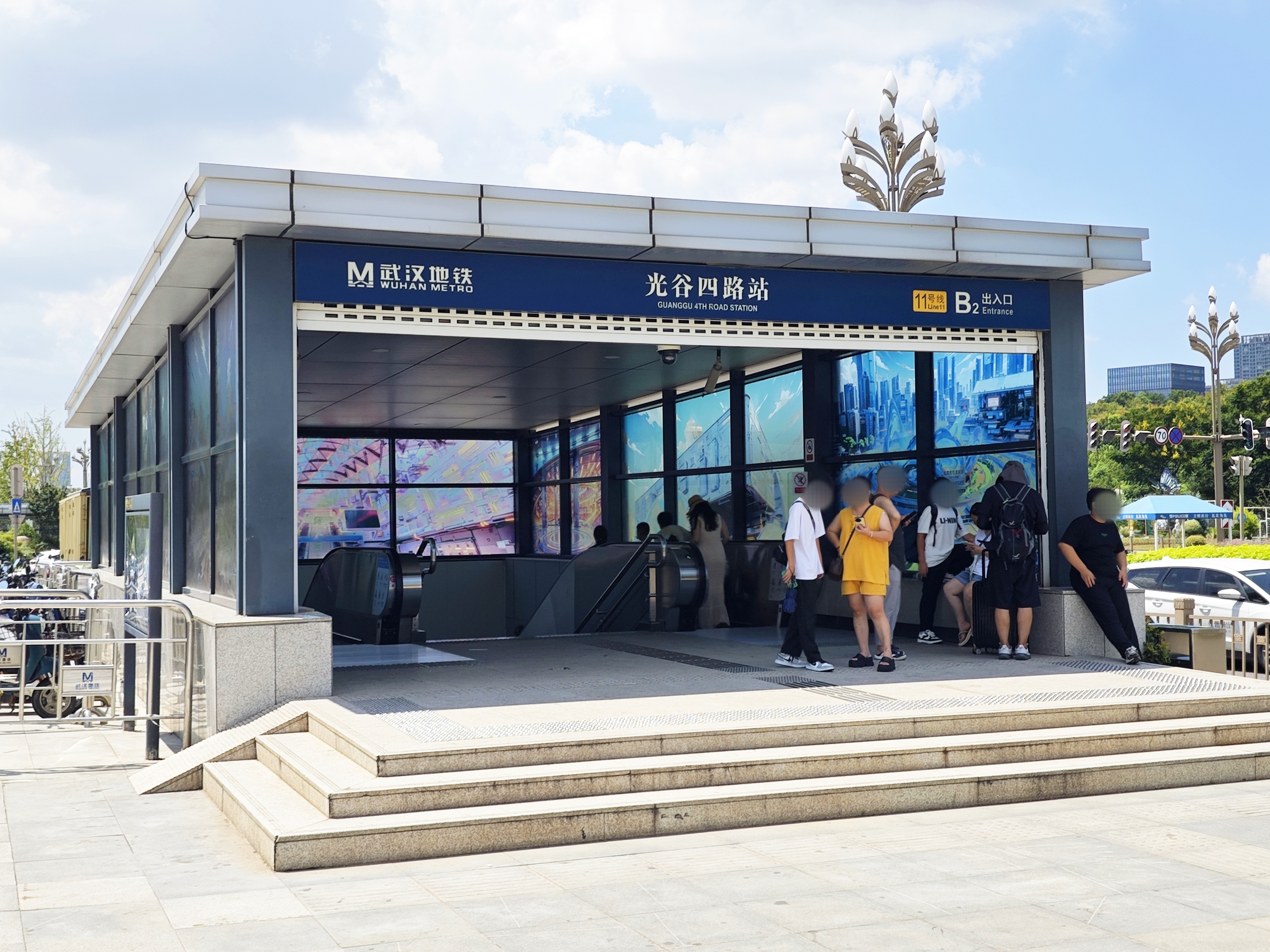
Exit B2
