= Baoxie station =

Metro station in Wuhan, China

Baoxie 豹澥 metro
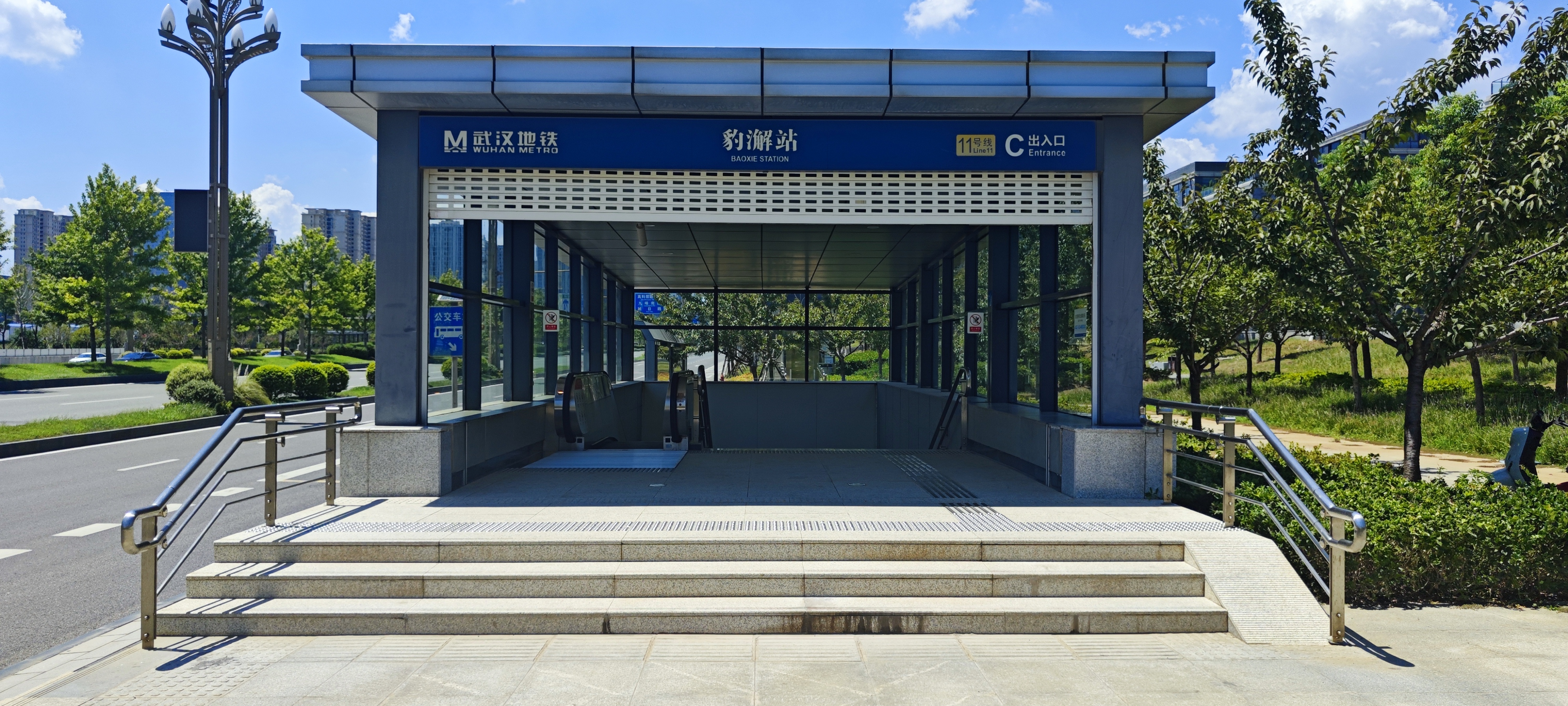
- Entrance C

General information
- Location: Hongshan District, Wuhan, Hubei; China
- Coordinates: 30.49116°N 114.5179°E
- Operated by: Wuhan Metro Co., Ltd
- Line: Line 11
- Platforms: 2 (1 island platform)

Construction
- Structure type: Underground

History
- Opened: October 1, 2018 (Line 11)

Services
| Preceding station | Wuhan Metro | Following station |
|---|---|---|
| Guanggu 6th Road towards Jiang'an Road | Line 11 | Guanggu 7th Road towards Gediannan Railway Station |
Location

Baoxie Station (Chinese: 豹澥站) is a station on Line 11 of the Wuhan Metro. It entered revenue service on October 1, 2018. It is located in Hongshan District.

== Station layout ==
| G | Entrances and Exits | Exits A-D |
| B1 | Concourse | Faregates, Station Agent |
| B2 | Westbound | ← Line 11 towards Jiang'an Road (Guanggu 6th Road) |
| B2 | Island platform, doors will open on the left |
| B2 | Eastbound | Line 11 towards Gediannan Railway Station (Guanggu 7th Road) → |
