= Zuoling station =

Metro station in Wuhan, China

Coordinates: 30.490628°N 114.616938°E

Zuoling 左岭 metro
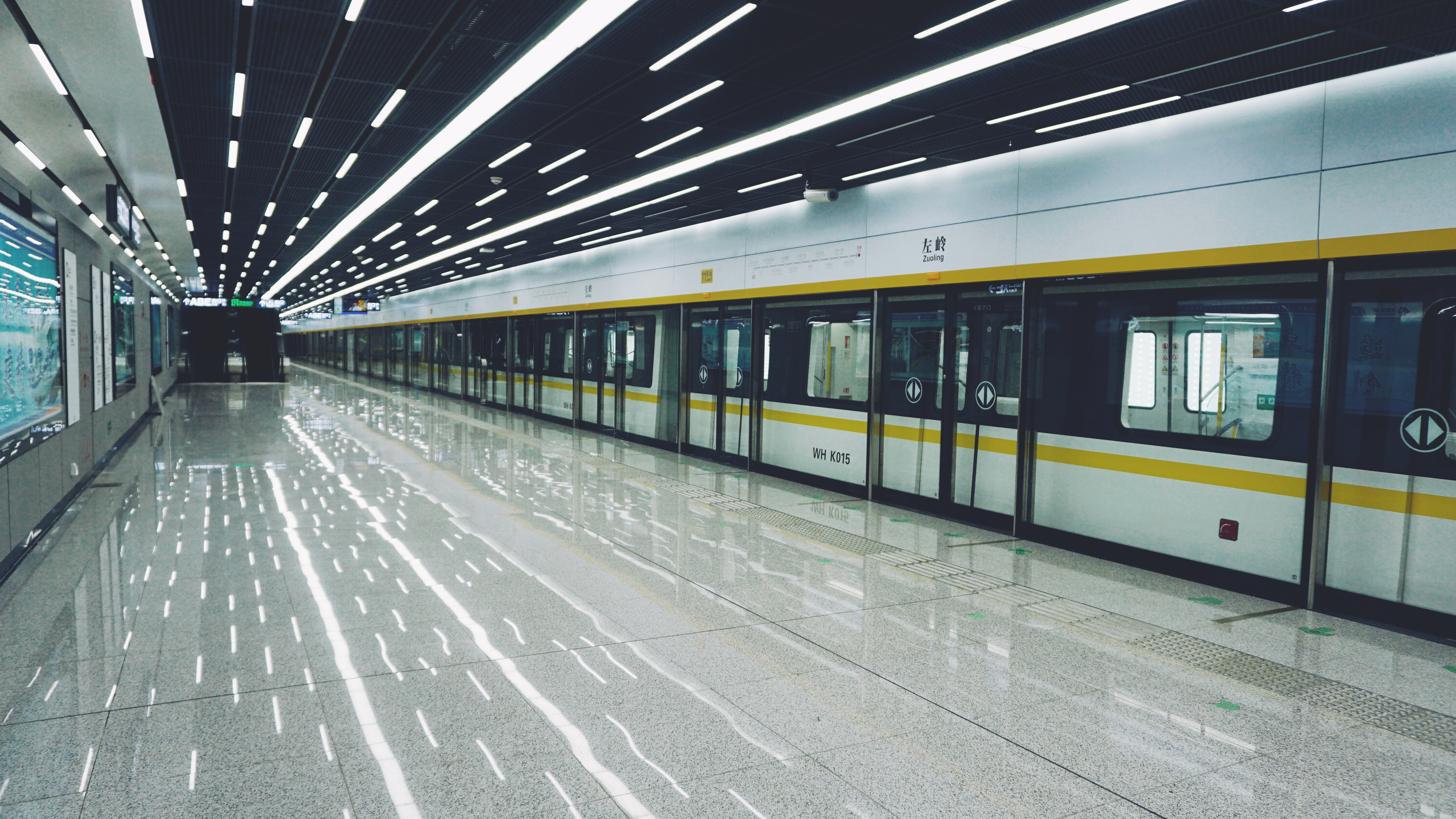

General information
- Location: Hongshan District, Wuhan, Hubei; China
- Operated by: Wuhan Metro Co., Ltd
- Line: Line 11
- Platforms: 2 (2 side platforms)

Construction
- Structure type: Underground

History
- Opened: October 1, 2018 (Line 11)

Services
Preceding station	Wuhan Metro	Following station
Weilai 3rd Road towards Jiang'an Road	Line 11	Gediannan Railway Station Terminus
Location

Zuoling Station (Chinese: 左岭站) is a station on Line 11 of the Wuhan Metro. It entered revenue service on October 1, 2018. It is located in Hongshan District and it was the eastern terminus of Line 11 until January 2, 2021.

== Station layout ==
G	Concourse	Faregates, Station Agent, Exits A-E
B1	Side platform, doors will open on the right
B1	Westbound	← Line 11 towards Jiang'an Road (Weilai 3rd Road)
B1	Eastbound	Line 11 towards Gediannan Railway Station (Terminus) →
B1	Side platform, doors will open on the right

== Gallery ==
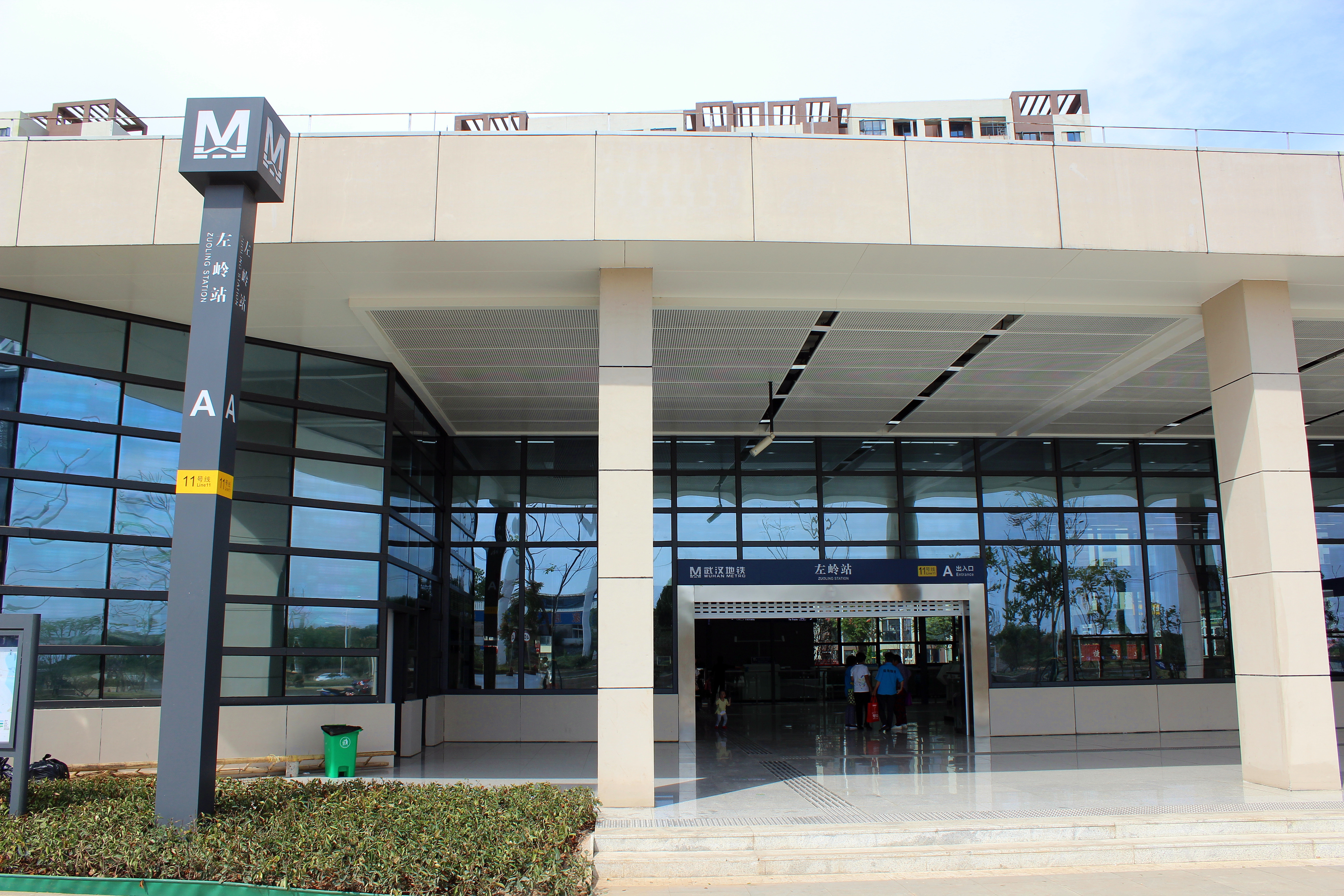
Entrance A

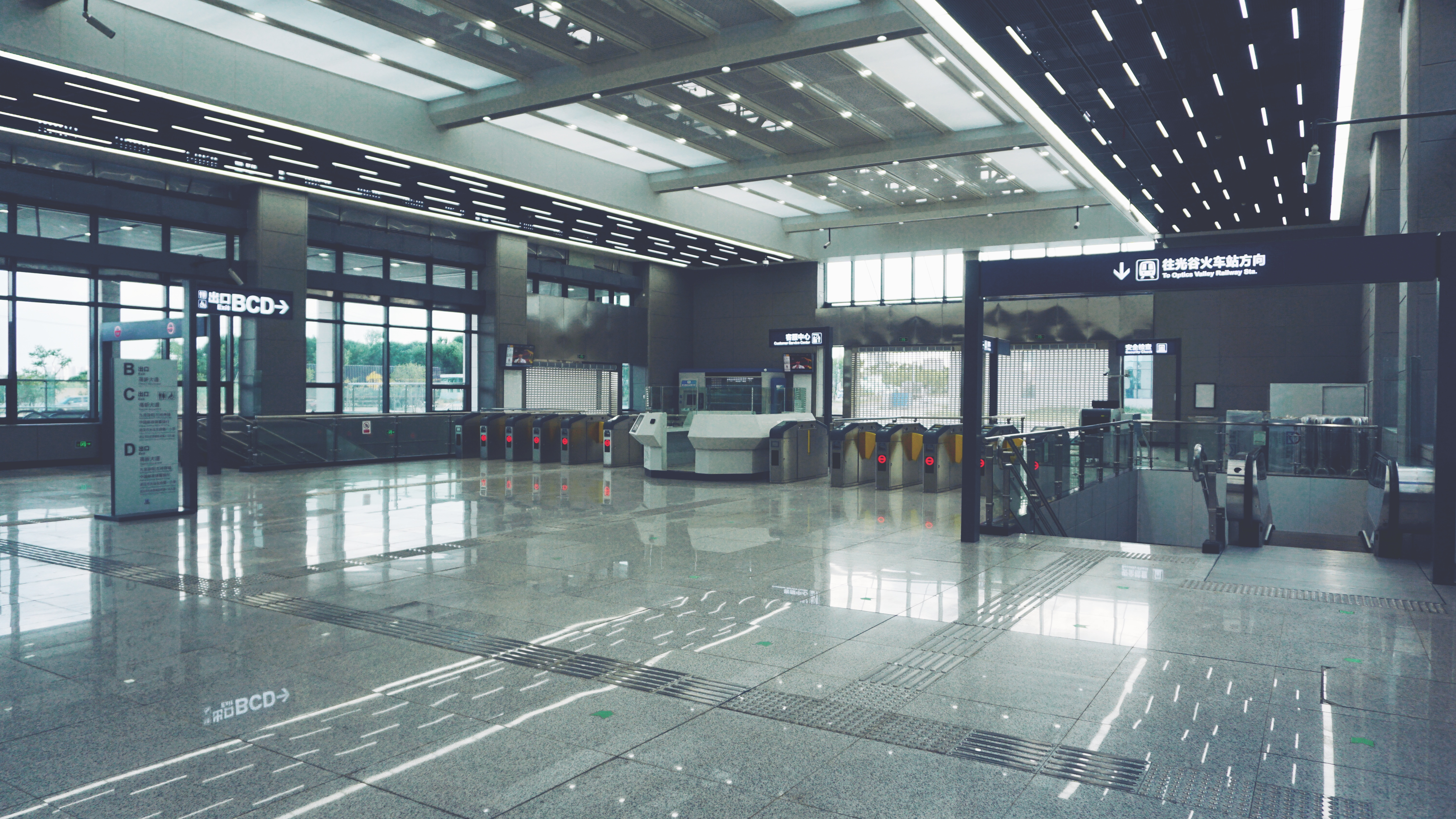
Concourse

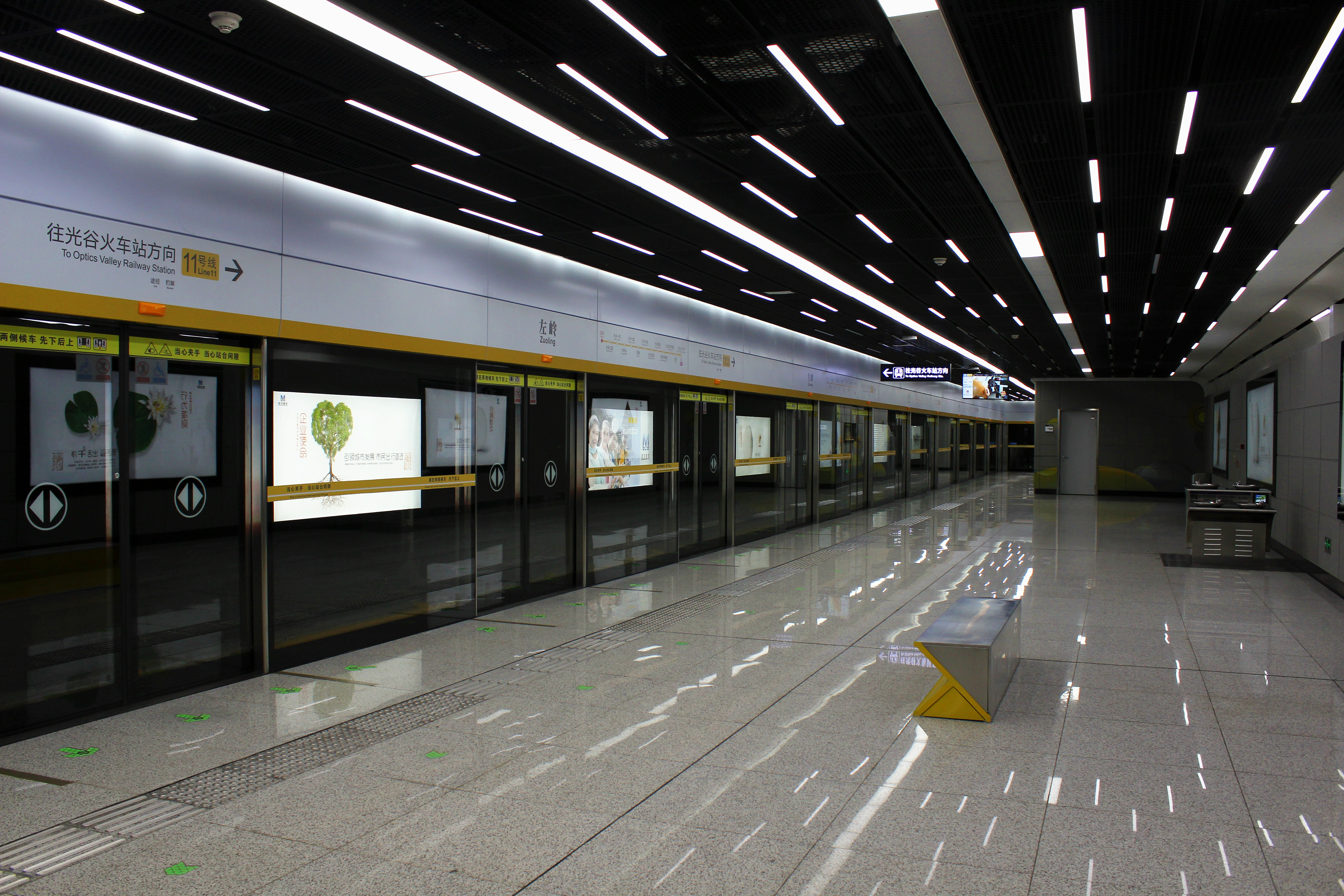
Platform
