= Line 11 (Wuhan Metro) =

Line of Wuhan Metro

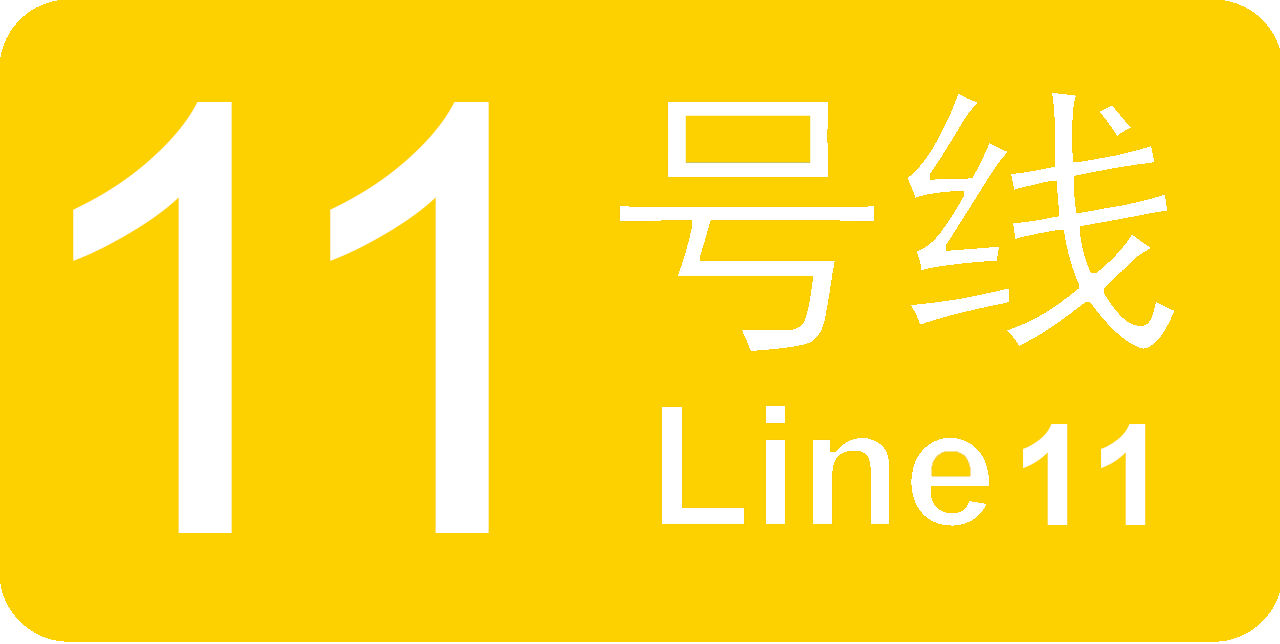

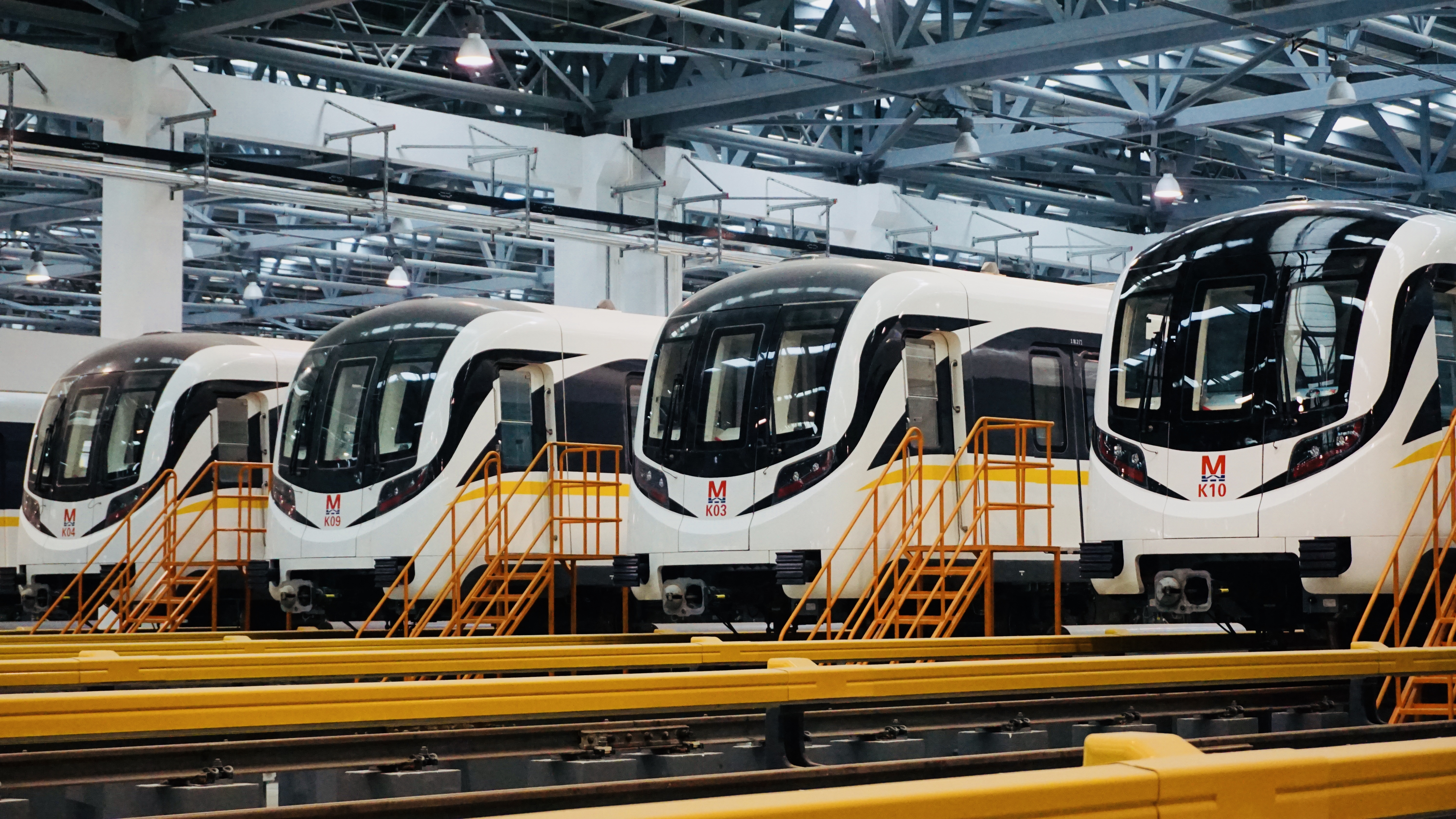

Overview
- Status: Operating
- Owner: Government of Wuhan
- Locale: Wuhan and Ezhou, Hubei
- Termini: Jiang'an Road; Gediannan Railway Station
- Stations: 23 (Operational); 31 (Future)

Service
- Type: Rapid transit
- System: Wuhan Metro
- Services: 1
- Operator: Wuhan Metro Group Co., Ltd.
- Rolling stock: CRRC Zhuzhou Locomotive Chinese Type A

History
- Opened: 1 October 2018; 7 years ago

Technical
- Line length: 39 km (24.23 mi)
- Number of tracks: 2
- Character: Underground
- Track gauge: 1,435 mm (4 ft 8 1/2 in)

Wuhan Metro Line 11 (Chinese: 武汉地铁11号线) is a metro line in Wuhan. This line connects Wuchang with the eastern Optics Valley. Construction of the first section Optics Valley section started on October 28, 2014.

== History ==
| Segment | Commencement | Length | Station(s) | Name |
|---|---|---|---|---|
| Wuhandong Railway Station — Zuoling | 1 October 2018 | 18.744 km (11.65 mi) | 13 | Phase 1 |
| Zuoling — Gediannan Railway Station | 2 January 2021 | 3.786 km (2.35 mi) | 1 | Phase 3 Ezhou Segment |
| East Square of Wuchang Railway Station — Wuhandong Railway Station | 27 December 2024 | 12.6 km (7.83 mi) | 7 | Phase 2 |
| Jiang’an Road — East Square of Wuchang Railway Station | 27 December 2024 | 4 km (2.49 mi) | 2 | Phase 3 Wuchang Segment |
| Huangjinkou — Wuhan West Railway Station | U/C (2027) | 2 km (1.24 mi) | 2 | Phase 3 Xinhanyang Segment |
| Wuhan West Railway Station — Jiang’an Road | U/C (2028) | 16.2 km (10.07 mi) | 6 | Phase 4 |

== Stations ==
| Station name | | Connections | Distance km | | Location |
| English | Chinese | Connections | Distance km | | Location |
|---|---|---|---|---|---|
| Huangjinkou | 黄金口 | 4 | | | |
| Wuhan West Railway Station | 武汉西站 | 14 | | | |
| Tangshan | 汤山 | | | | |
| Sixin Boulevard | 四新大道 | 3 | | | |
| Fangcao Road | 芳草路 | 12 | | | |
| Meilin | 梅林 | 10 | | | |
| North International Expo Center | 国博中心北 | 6 | | | |
| Jiangguo Road | 江国路 | | | | |
| Jiang'an Road | 江安路 | | | | |
| Ziyanghu | 紫阳湖 | 4 5 (Note: Out of system transfer for both lines at Fuxing Road) | | | |
| East Square of Wuchang Railway Station | 武昌站东广场 | 12; 4 7 (Note: Out of system transfer for both lines at Wuchang Railway Station); WCN | | | |
| Dingziqiao | 丁字桥 | | | | |
| Mafangshan | 马房山 | 8 | | | |
| Huquan | 虎泉 | 2 | | | |
| Wuhan Sports University | 武汉体育学院 | | | | |
| Optics Valley Square | 光谷广场 | 2 | | | |
| Guanshan Boulevard | 关山大道 | Wuhan BRT; Optics Valley Tram (via Xiongchu Avenue Station) | | | |
| Wuhandong Railway Station | 武汉东站 | 2 LFN | 0.000 | 0.000 | Jiangxia |
| Hukou | 湖口 | | 1.468 | 1.468 | Jiangxia |
| Tongji Hospital | 光谷同济医院 | | 1.940 | 3.408 | Jiangxia/Hongshan |
| Guanggushengwuyuan | 光谷生物园 | | 1.420 | 4.828 | Hongshan |
| Guanggu 4th Road | 光谷四路 | Optics Valley Monorail (via Gaoxin Boulevard) | 1.075 | 5.903 | Hongshan |
| Guanggu 5th Road | 光谷五路 | 19 | 1.287 | 7.190 | Hongshan |
| Guanggu 6th Road | 光谷六路 | | 0.926 | 8.116 | Hongshan |
| Baoxie | 豹澥 | | 1.133 | 9.249 | Jiangxia/Hongshan |
| Guanggu 7th Road | 光谷七路 | Optics Valley Tram | 1.067 | 10.316 | Jiangxia |
| Changlingshan | 长岭山 | | 2.802 | 13.118 | Jiangxia |
| Weilai 1st Road | 未来一路 | | 2.153 | 15.271 | Jiangxia |
| Weilai 3rd Road | 未来三路 | | 2.029 | 17.300 | Hongshan |
| Zuoling | 左岭 | | 1.444 | 18.744 | Hongshan |
| Gediannan Railway Station | 葛店南站 | GNN | 3.786 | 22.530 | Huarong (Ezhou) |
