= Qingshan, Wuhan =

Qingshan 青山区
- District
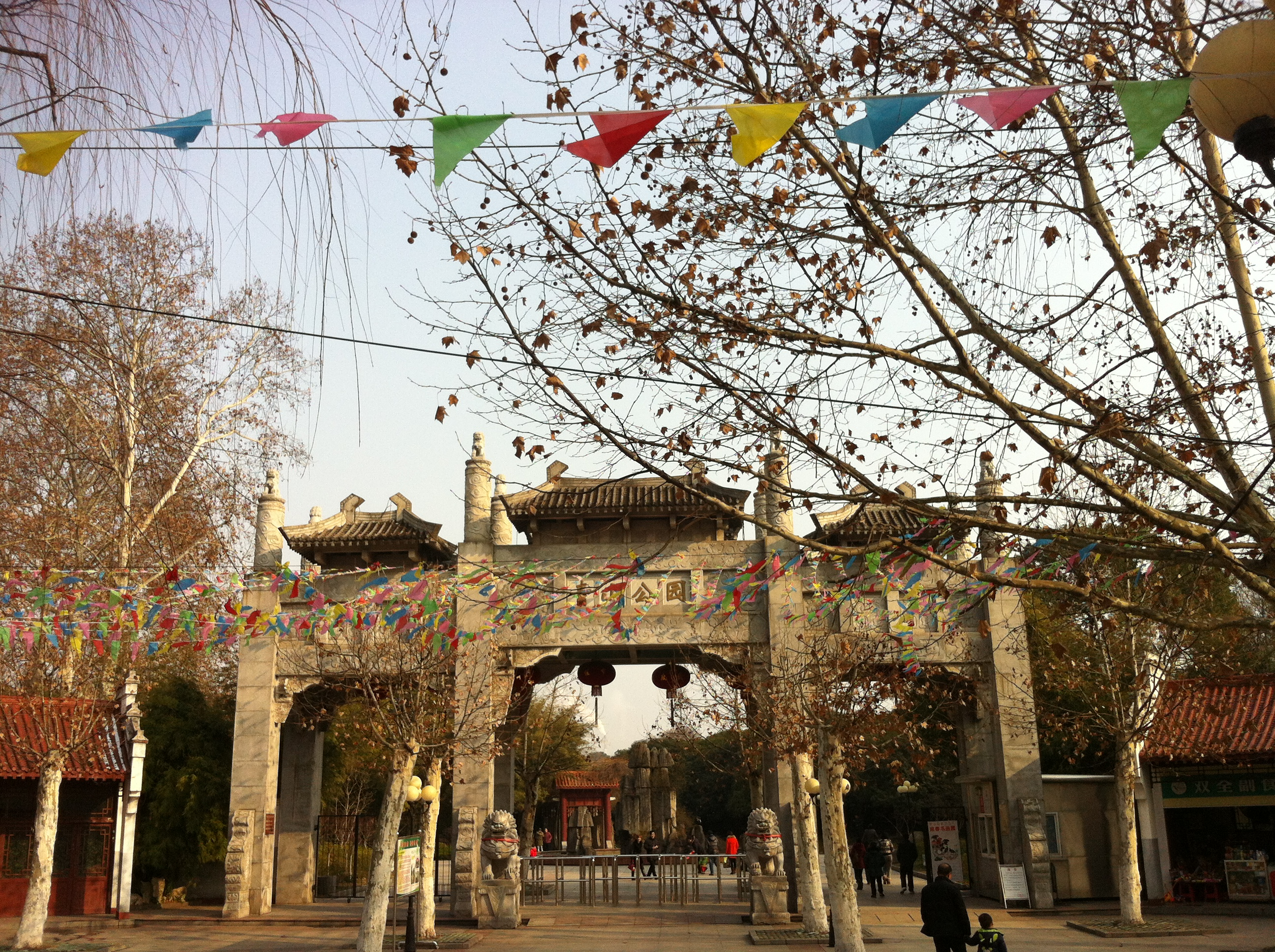
- Qingshan Park Main Gate

- Location in Hubei
- Coordinates: 30°37′51″N 114°24′17″E
- Country: People's Republic of China
- Province: Hubei
- Sub-provincial city: Wuhan

Area
  - Total: 68.40 km^{2} (26.41 sq mi)

Population (2020)
  - Total: 431,818
  - Density: 6,313/km^{2} (16,350/sq mi)
- Time zone: UTC+8 (China Standard)
- Website: Official Site

Qingshan District (Chinese: 青山区; pinyin: Qīngshān Qū) is one of 13 urban districts of the prefecture-level city of Wuhan, the capital of Hubei Province, China. On the right bank of the Yangtze, it borders the districts of Wuchang (for a very small section) to the southwest and Hongshan to the east and south, except for Tianxing Island which lies due north of Qingshan; on the opposite bank it borders Jiang'an.

Qingshan District has been described as Wuhan's industrial hub.

== Geography ==
=== Administrative divisions ===
As of 2015, Qingshan District administers ten subdistricts, one administrative committee and one economic development zone:

Location Name	Chinese (S)	Hanyu Pinyin
Honggangcheng Subdistrict	红钢城街道	Hónggāngchéng Jiēdào
Xingouqiao Subdistrict	新沟桥街道	Xīngōuqiáo Jiēdào
Hongweilu Subdistrict	红卫路街道	Hóngwèilù Jiēdào
Yejin Subdistrict	冶金街道	Yějīn Jiēdào
Ganghuacun Subdistrict	钢花村街道	Gānghuācūn Jiēdào
Gongrencun Subdistrict	工人村街道	Gōngréncūn Jiēdào
Qingshanzhen Subdistrict	青山镇街道	Qīngshānzhèn Jiēdào
Changqian Subdistrict	厂前街道	Chǎngqián Jiēdào
Wudong Subdistrict	武东街道	Wǔdōng Jiēdào
Baiyushan Subdistrict	白玉山街道	Báiyùshān Jiēdào
Gangduhuayuan Administrative Committee	钢都花园管委会	Gāngdūhuāyuán Guǎnwěihuì
Qingshan District Economic Development Zone	青山区经济开发区（北湖园区）	Qīngshān Qū Jīngjì Kāifāqū (Běihúyuán Qū)

== Economy ==
Qingshan District has been described as Wuhan's industrial hub, it is home to Qingshan shipyard of China Changjiang National Shipping (Group) Corporation and a factory of the Wuhan Iron and Steel Corporation. Its eight 'pillar industries' are metallurgy, chemical manufacture, environmental protection, electric power, machinery, shipping, construction, and building materials.

== Environment ==
Due to its history as an industrial base, the district is considered severely polluted with heavy metals. The local air quality has been improved in recent years but is still considered to exceed acceptable levels and is among the worst of Wuhan's districts.

The district is a demo area of the sponge city concept to reduce flooding.
