= Gedian South railway station =

Railway station in Ezhou, China

Gedian South 葛店南
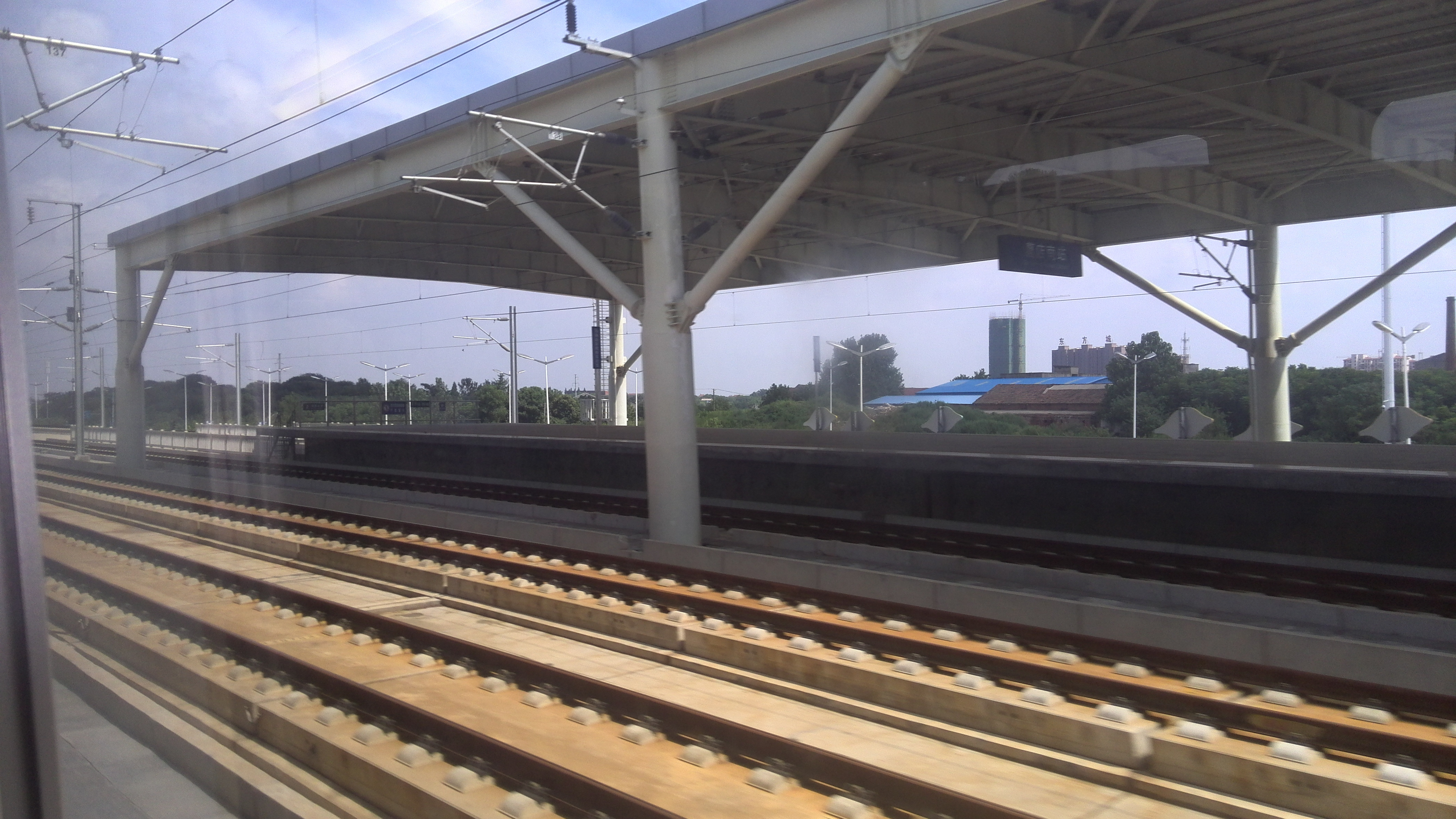

General information
- Location: Huarong District, Ezhou, Hubei; China
- Coordinates: 30.4930°N 114.6549°E
- Lines: Wuhan–Huanggang intercity railway Wuhan–Jiujiang passenger railway

History
- Opened: 18 June 2014
Location

Gedian South railway station (Chinese: 葛店南站) is a railway station in Huarong District, Ezhou, Hubei, China.

== History ==
This station opened with the Wuhan–Huanggang intercity railway on 18 June 2014. The line through to Jiujiang, the Wuhan–Jiujiang passenger railway, was opened on 21 September 2017.

== Wuhan Metro ==
Gediannan Railway Station 葛店南站 metro
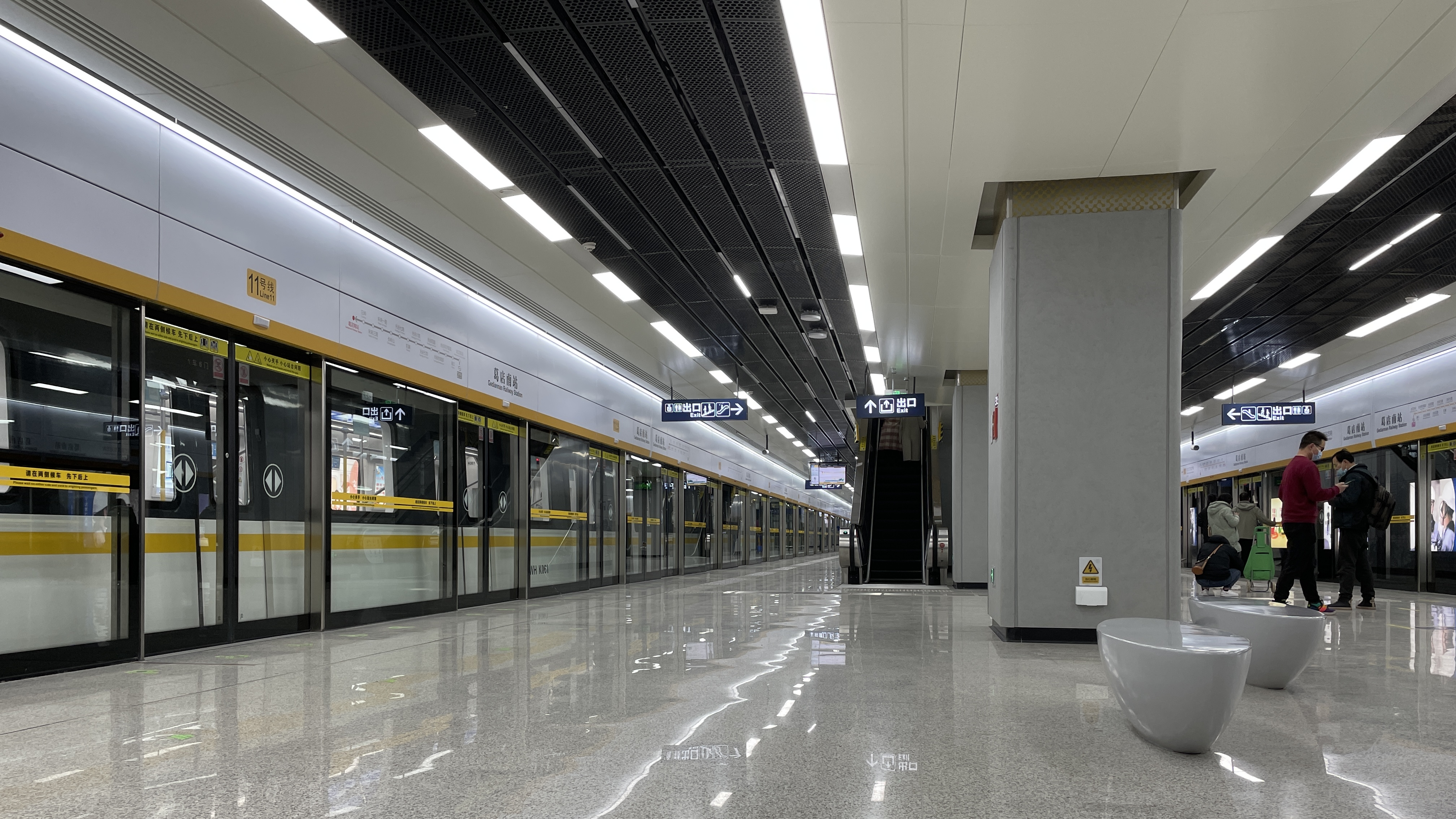

General information
- Location: Huarong District, Ezhou, Hubei; China
- Operator: Wuhan Metro Co., Ltd
- Line: Line 11
- Platforms: 2 (1 island platform)

Construction
- Structure type: Underground

History
- Opened: January 2, 2021 (Line 11)
Location

Gediannan Railway Station (Chinese: 葛店南站) is a station on Line 11 of the Wuhan Metro. It entered revenue service on January 2, 2021. It is located in Huarong District in Ezhou and it is the eastern terminus of Line 11.

Preceding station	China Railway High-speed	Following station
Zuoling towards Wuhan	Wuhan–Jiujiang high-speed railway	Huarong East towards Jiujiang or Lushan
Zuoling towards Wuhan	Wuhan–Huanggang intercity railway	Huarong South towards Huanggang East
Preceding station	Wuhan Metro	Following station
Zuoling towards Jiang'an Road	Line 11	Terminus
