= Gucun Park =

Park in Shanghai, China

Coordinates: 31.347412°N 121.384484°E

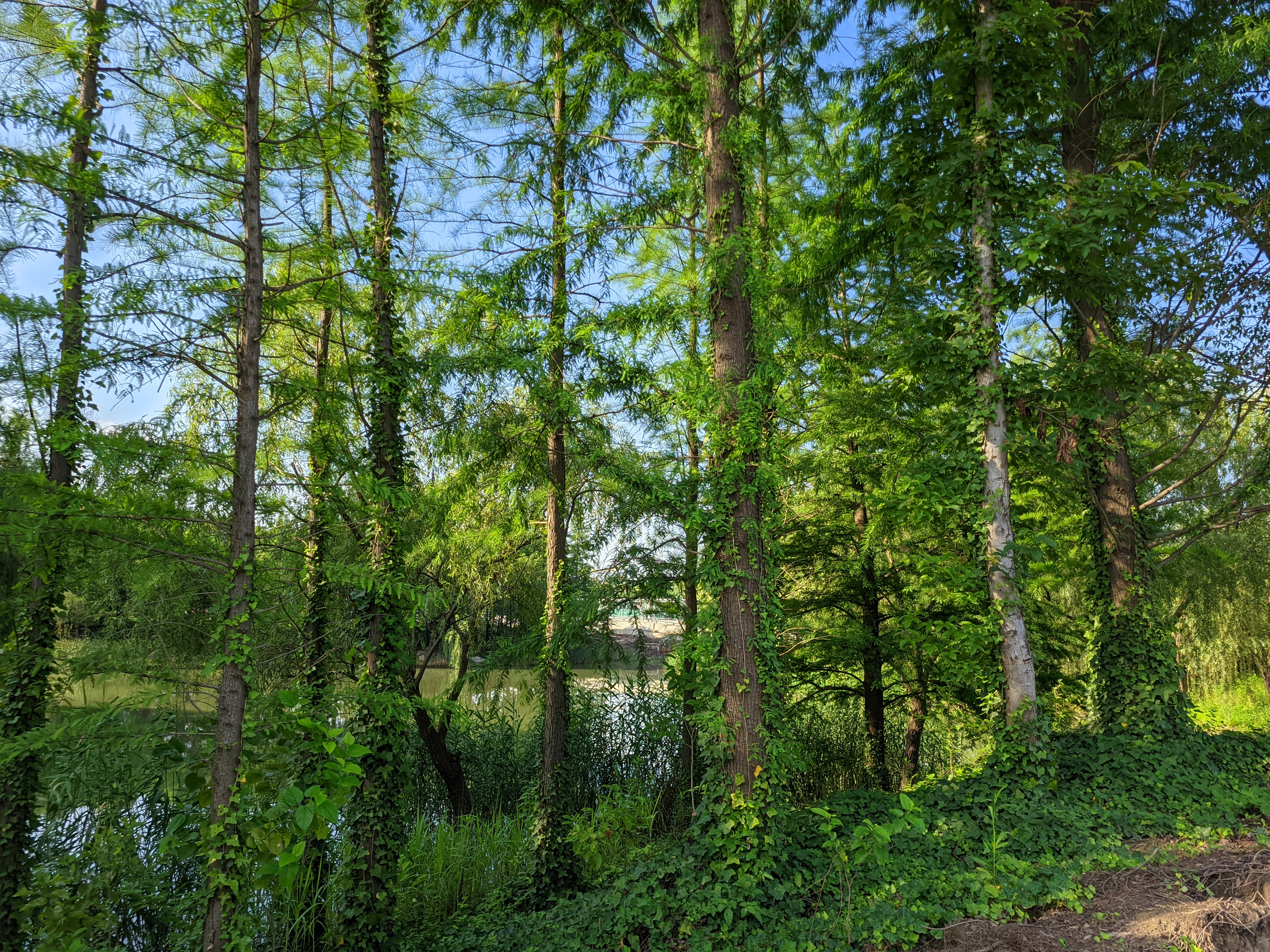
A scene of Gucun Park

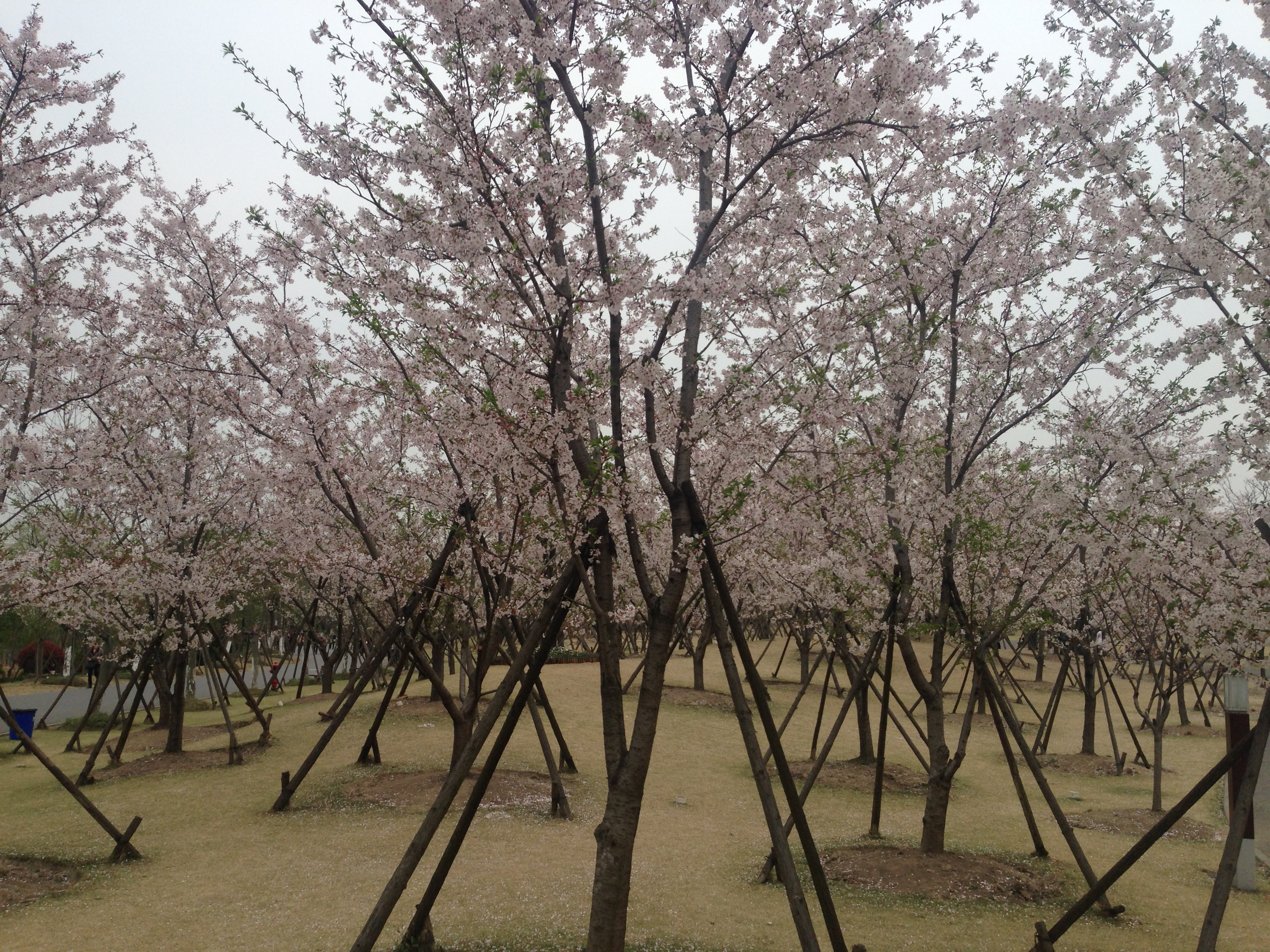
The cherry blossoms are in full bloom.

Gucun Park (Chinese: 顾村公园) is a large park located in Gucun, Baoshan District, Shanghai, China. Its planned area covers over 4.3 square meters. Based on the city's "One axis, one belt, three districts, and seven parks" plan, its first stage park opened in 2009 with an area of 1.8 square kilometers.

In 2011, the first Cherry Blossoms Festival was held in Gucun Park. This festival has since been held every year.

== Transportation ==
The park's Gate 2 is in front of Gucun Park station of Shanghai Metro Line 7 and Line 15.

== See also ==
- Longwangtang Cherry Blossom Park
- East Lake Cherry Blossom Park
