= Mount Mo =

Mountain in Hubei, China

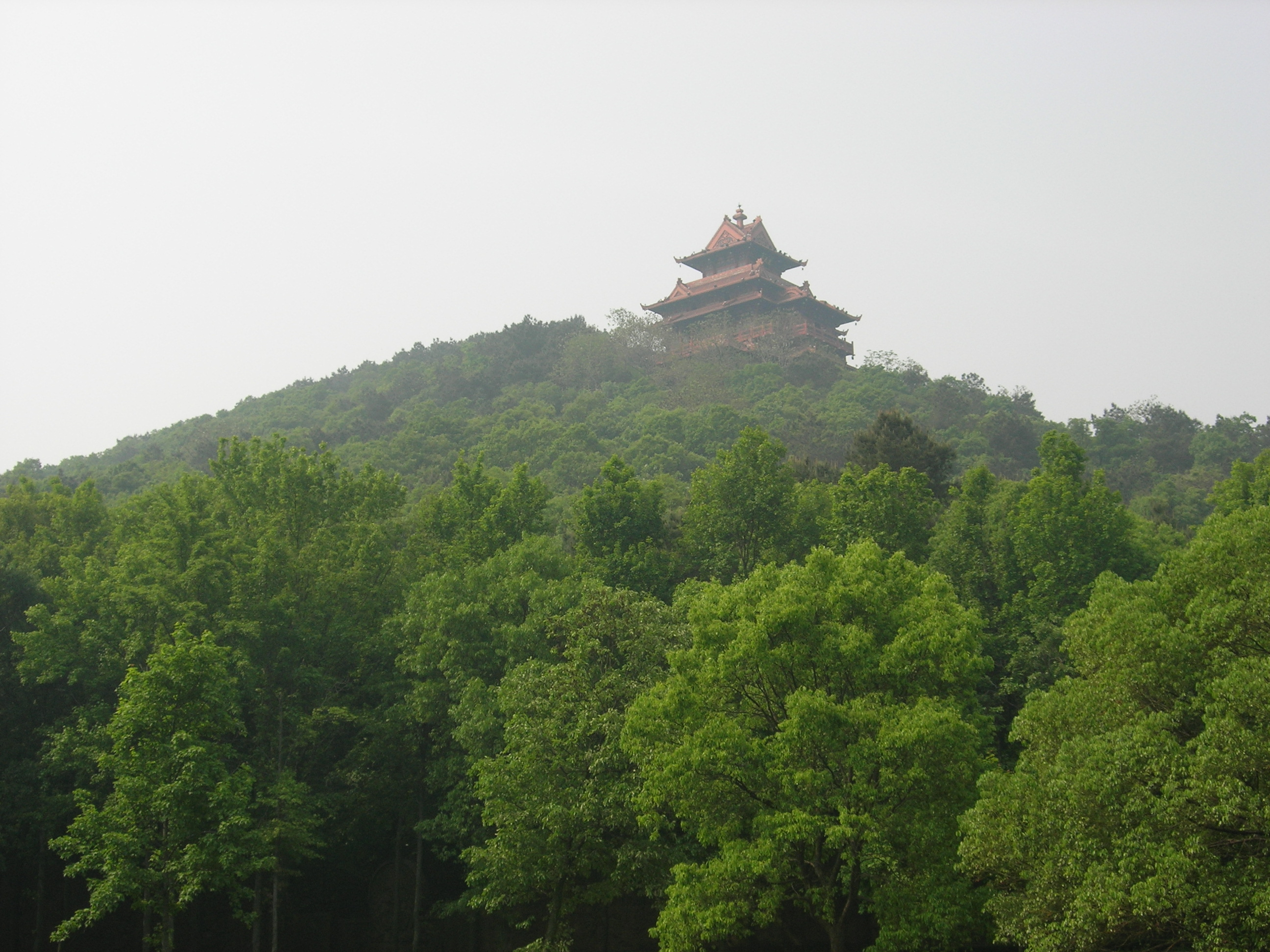

Highest point
- Coordinates: 30°33′04″N 114°25′04″E

Geography
- Location within Hubei Location within China
- Location: Hongshan District, Wuhan, Hubei

Climbing
- Easiest route: cable car

Mount Mo (Chinese: 磨山; pinyin: Mò Shān; lit. 'Millstone Mountain') (variously translated as Mo Hill, Moshan etc.), historically Mount Mo'er (Chinese: 磨儿山) and Mount Long (Chinese: 龙山), is a mountain of historical and cultural significance located on the southern shore of East Lake, a AAAAA Tourist Attraction of China in Hongshan District, Wuhan, Hubei.

== Etymology ==
The 'Mo' in 'Mount Mo' refers to a millstone (Chinese: 石磨). The mountain is so named because it is round like a millstone.

== History ==
Several hundred years ago, Mount Mo, then known as Mount Long, was the site of Fahua Temple. The temple had several hundred monks. Due to the spread of disease via mosquitoes, the temple was eventually abandoned.

After a Spring 1954 visit to Mount Mo by Zhu De, a pavilion was built in commemoration of the visit with the inscription, "东湖暂让西湖好，今后将比西湖强", meaning, 'For now East Lake is not as good as West Lake, but it will be stronger than West Lake.'

In an unusual event on June 22, 1999, at 7:35 PM, seven hundred trees at Mount Mo were knocked down by a wind coming off East Lake. There was speculation that the event was the result of UFO activity.

In 2004, Moshan Residential Community (磨山社区) was transferred from Guanshan Subdistrict to East Lake Scenic Area Subdistrict.

== Scenic area ==
Mount Mo is a natural scenic area and includes many buildings that are reflective of Jingchu culture and are collectively referred to as 'Chu City' (楚城). The Chu City architecture was built in attempt to imitate the way that Ying had been built. The city gate is 23.4 meters tall and 105 meters long. The watchtower is 12.4 meters tall and the city wall is 11 meters tall.

Mount Mo includes East Lake Cherry Blossom Park and a Plum Blossom Park, which was designated as the Chinese Plum Blossom Research Center in 1992.
