= Shizishan =

Shizishan may refer to:

- Shizishan District, a former district in Tongling, Anhui, China
- Shizishan Subdistrict, Wuhan, a subdistrict in Hongshan, Wuhan, Hubei, China
- Shizishan Subdistrict, Chengdu, a subdistrict in Jinjiang, Chengdu, Sichuan, China
- Shizishan Subdistrict, Ziyang, a subdistrict in Yanjiang, Ziyang, Sichuan, China
