= Zhuodaoquan Temple =

Buddhist temple in Hubei, China

- 卓刀泉寺
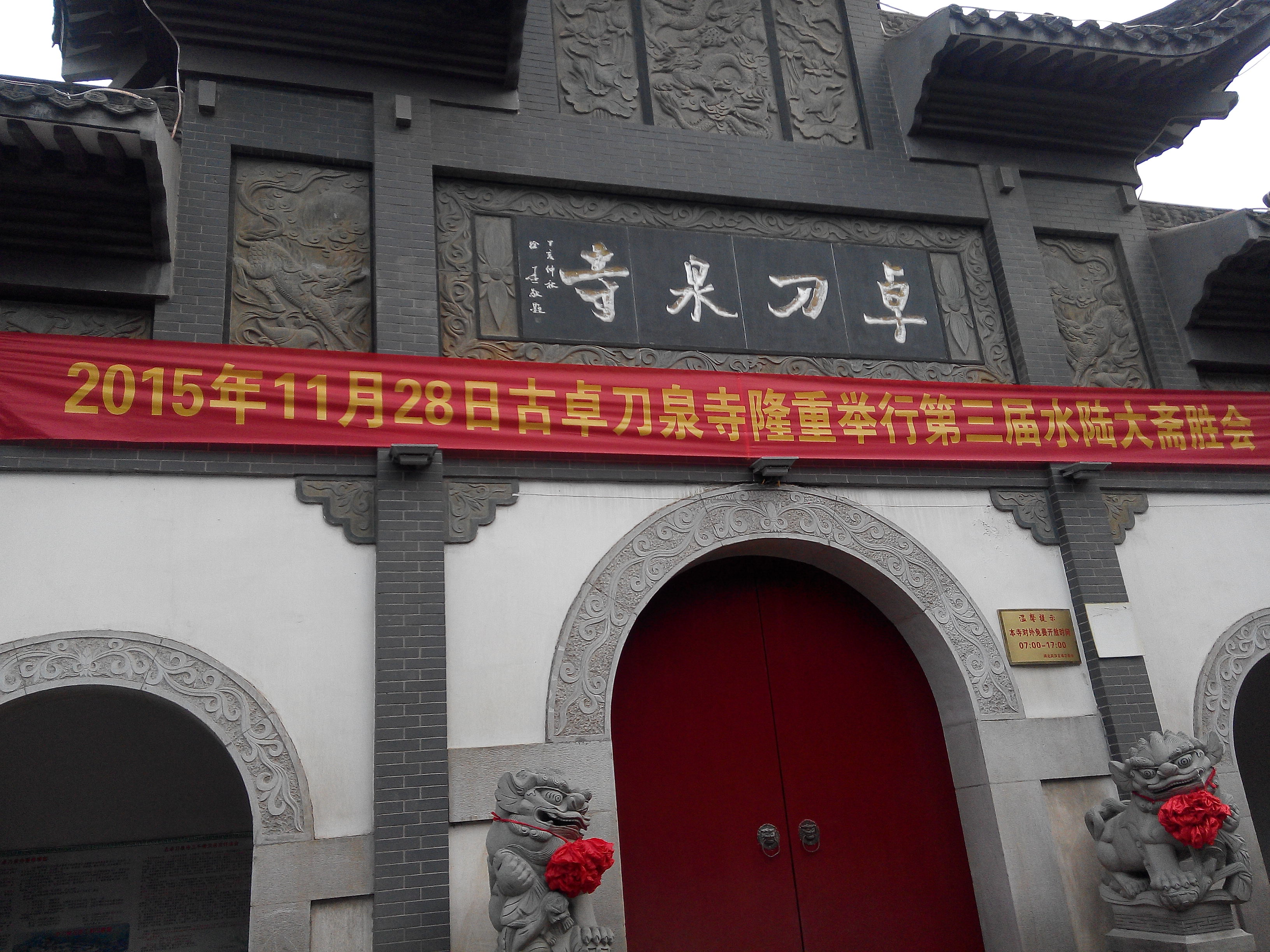
- Zhuodaoquan Temple

Religion
- Affiliation: Buddhism

Location
- Location: Zhuodaoquan Subdistrict, Hongshan, Wuhan, Hubei
- Country: China

Architecture
- Style: Chinese architecture

Zhuodaoquan Temple (Chinese: 卓刀泉寺; pinyin: Zhuódāoquán Sì; lit. 'Zhuodao Spring Temple'), historically Yuquan Temple (御泉寺), is a Buddhist temple and martial temple located on the southwest hillside of Mount Fuhu (伏虎山), in Zhuodaoquan Subdistrict (卓刀泉街道), Hongshan of Wuhan, Hubei, China.

== History ==
According to a story passed down at the temple and recorded in part in the 寰宇通志 (Huányǔ Tōngzhì) written in 1455 and the late Qing 江夏縣志 (Jiāngxià Xiànzhì), in the year AD 208, as Guan Yu passed through the area, his troops and their horses were thirsty. In a fit of anger, Guan Yu thrust his sword into a rock (卓刀, zhuódāo). This opened up a spring which provided water for his troops and their horses to drink. Zhuodaoquan Temple takes its name from this story. Their horses were kept at nearby Mount Mafang (馬房山, "Horse Stable Mountain") on the present-day campus of the Wuhan University of Technology.

The temple was built during the Song dynasty. It was originally named Yuquan Temple (御泉寺). It was destroyed and rebuilt many times over the course of the Ming dynasty. It was rebuilt again during the reign of the Kangxi Emperor.

During the Taiping Rebellion in the 1850s, Zhuodaoquan Temple was destroyed. It was rebuilt in 1858 after the recapturing of Wuchang by Qing forces. In 1876, 1,000 trees were planted around the temple.

In 1916, the temple was renovated in the style of siheyuan and included statues of Liu Bei, Guan Yu, and Zhang Fei.

The temple was used as a headquarters for military operations during the Northern Expedition.

In 1956, the temple was repaired by the Wuhan City government. In 1959, the temple was recognized as an important cultural heritage site.

The temple and statues were damaged during the Cultural Revolution. The temple was reopened in 1988.

In 2010, Hongshan District refurbished and restored the temple increasing the overall area of the temple. The well connecting to the Zhuodao Spring was restored.

== Gallery ==
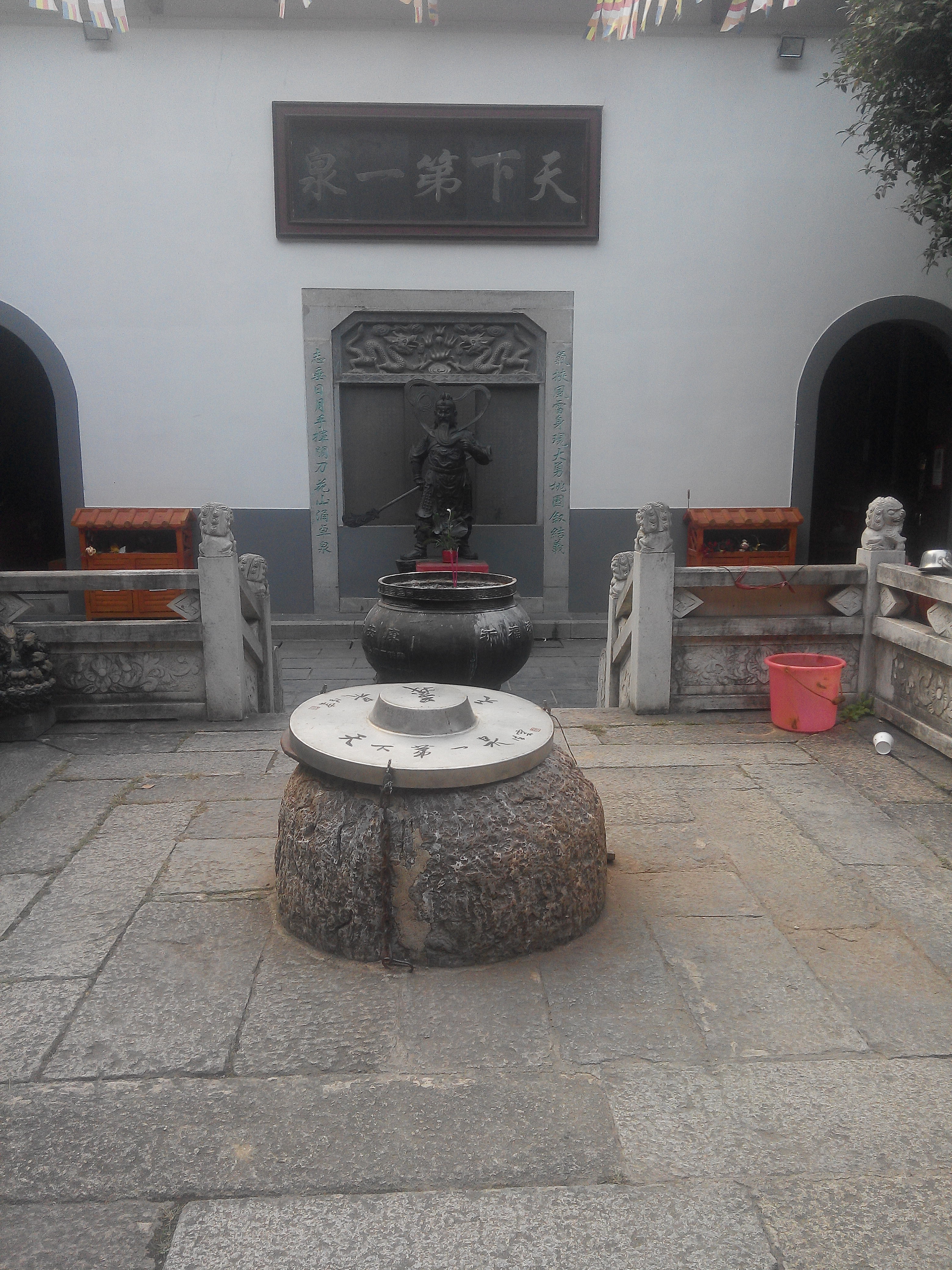
Well of Zhuodao Spring (Zhuodao Quan)

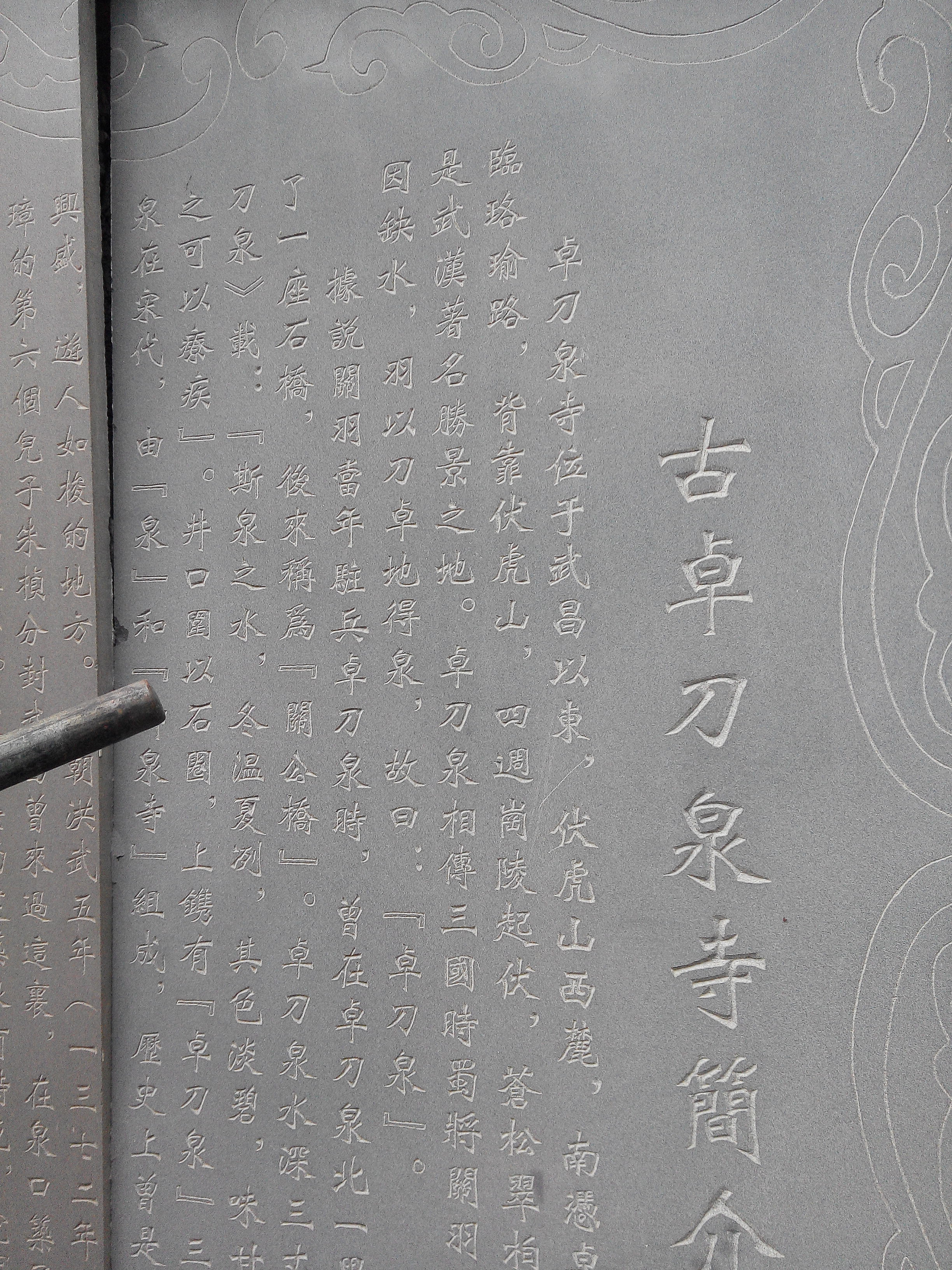
Introduction to Ancient Zhuodaoquan Temple

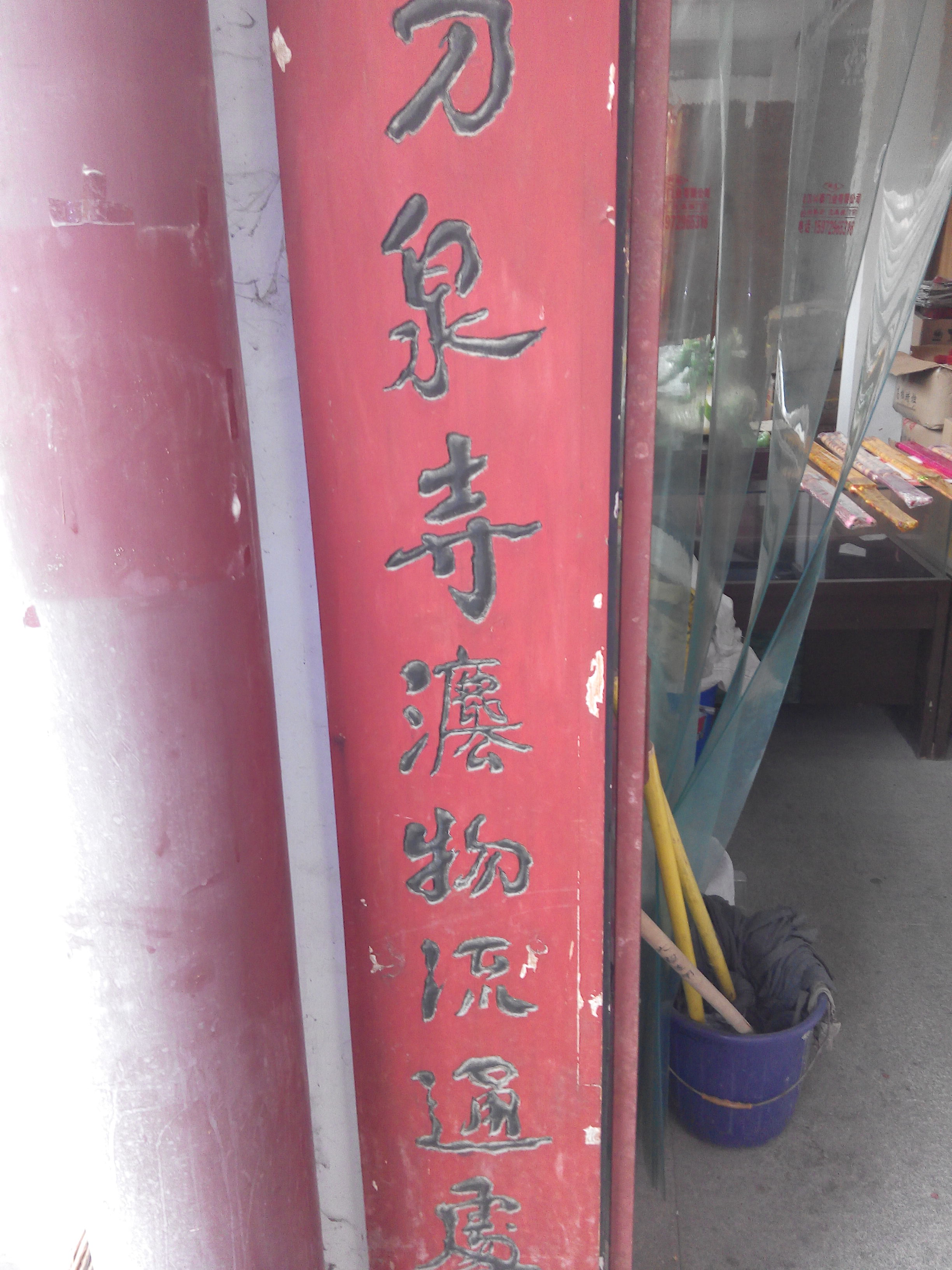
Zhuodaoquan Temple Religious Materials Sales
