= East Lake (Wuhan) =

Lake in Wuhan, China

- Dong Hu
- 东湖 (Chinese)
- Location within China Location within Hubei
- Location: Wuchang District and Hongshan District, Wuhan, Hubei
- Coordinates: 30°33′30″N 114°24′00″E
- Part of: Yangtze River Basin
- Basin countries: China
- Surface elevation: 10 metres (33 ft)
- Islands: Luzhou (芦洲)

East Lake
- Traditional Chinese: 東湖
- Simplified Chinese: 东湖
- Literal meaning: "East Lake"
Transcriptions
Standard Mandarin
- Hanyu Pinyin: Dōng Hú

East Lake (simplified Chinese: 东湖; traditional Chinese: 東湖; pinyin: Dōng Hú) is a large freshwater lake within the city limits of Wuhan, China, the largest or the second largest urban lake in China. Wuhan's East Lake covers an area of 88 square kilometers (33 square kilometers of water area). It is one of the 5A tourist zones of China, and admits over a million people yearly. It is one of the largest sites in Huazhong District. It is also the largest "City Lake" in China. East Lake is made of four areas, Ting Tao, Moshan, Luo Yan Island and Museum of Hubei Province.

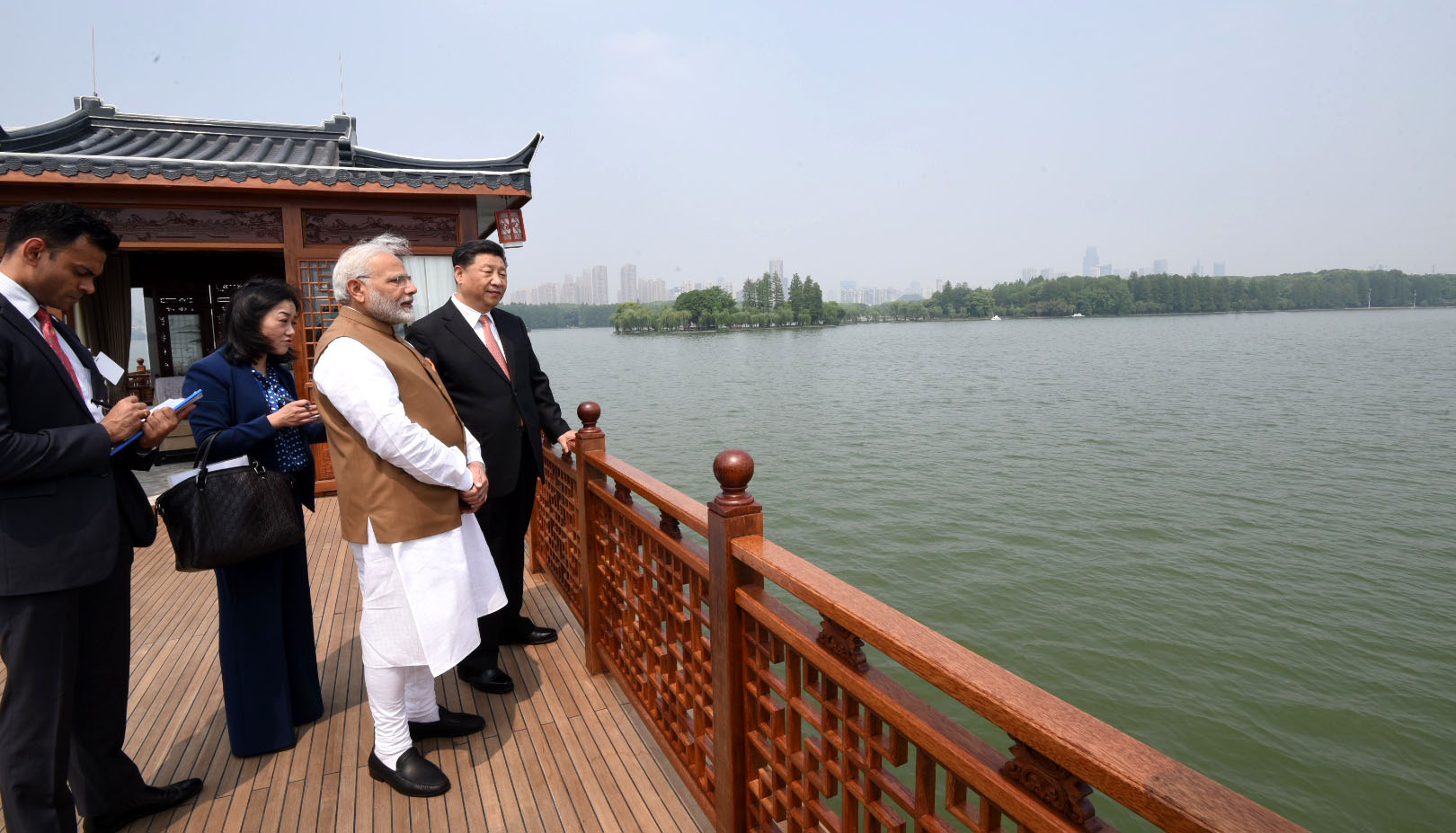
The General Secretary of the Chinese Communist Party Xi Jinping and the Prime Minister of India Narendra Modi on Wuhan's East Lake in 2018.

One end of Moshan features a Daoist temple built over the putative site of where one of the characters in Romance of the Three Kingdoms performed special Qimen Dunjia rites before the famous battle of Red Cliffs. No one knows precisely the actual location, but the Moshan site was an archeological dig in the early part of the twentieth century.

== Environmental issues ==
The lake was cut off from the Yangtze River in 1957. Water quality has deteriorated since because of 180,000 tons discharge of wastewater (domestic sewage and industrial) into the lake per day. Each year, about 441 tons of nitrogen and 40 tons of phosphorus flow into the lake. Most parts of the lake have been assessed as eutrophicated, unsuitable for drinking and many recreational purposes.

== Notable sites around the lake ==
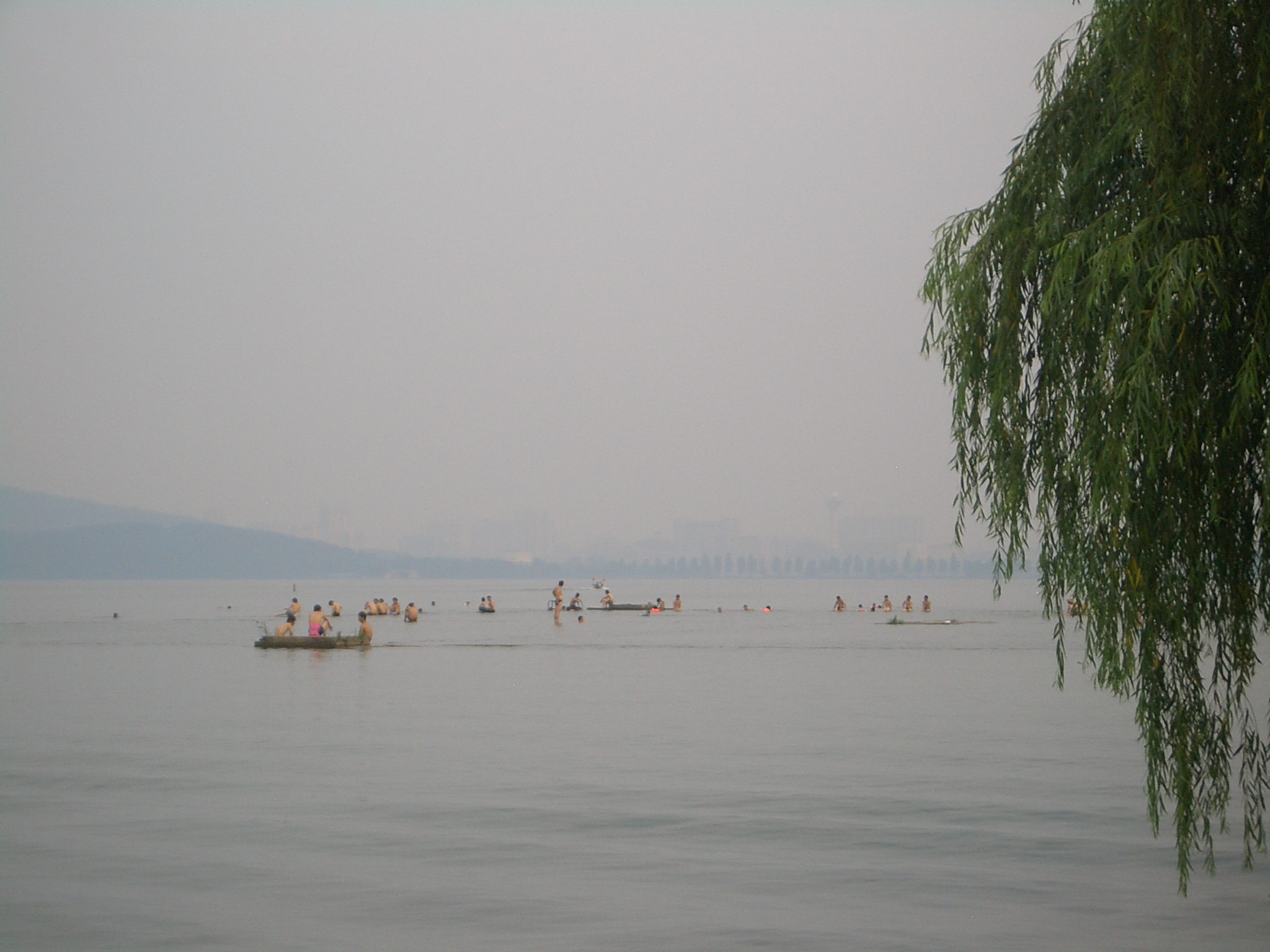
Summer in Liyuan Park

In clockwise order, starting from the southwest corner:

- Liyuan Park - a large urban park on the west side of the lake, with a popular free swimming area
- Hubei Provincial Museum
- Hubei Art Museum; the two museums are across the street from each other, just a block from the main entrance to Liyuan Park
- Wuhan Donghu Ocean Aquarium, proud of its flock of penguins
- Wuhan Railway Station - a few km northeast of the lake
- Moshan (磨山, "Millstone Mountain") Scenic Area, including East Lake Cherry Blossom Park
- The "Chu Castle" (楚城)
- Wuhan Botanical Garden
- East Lake Cherry Blossom Park
- China University of Geosciences, Wuhan Campus
- "Ba Yi" ("First of August") open-air swimming pool
- Houshan (Monkey Mountain) but no monkeys. One must travel to nearby Forest Park to see live monkeys, some un-caged.
- Wuhan University main campus
- Mao Zedong Memorial Residence: The former residence of Mao Zedong, where he stayed 48 times. It is also known as "Mao Zedong's Other Hometown" by locals.
- Qu Yuan Memorial Hall: A tower dedicated to Quyuan along with a statue of him.

Several causeways cross the eastern part of the lake, providing access to recreational fishing sites and beaches. In 2012, the construction of a major 6-lane road under the lake (Donghu Tongdao) was started. The Donghu Lake tunnel, China's longest tunnel under a lake, was opened to traffic at the end of 2015. A car could run through the 10.6-kilometer-long tunnel in around 15 minutes.

In 2010, plans for extensive new development on the lake shores caused widespread criticism among the citizenry.

== Image gallery ==
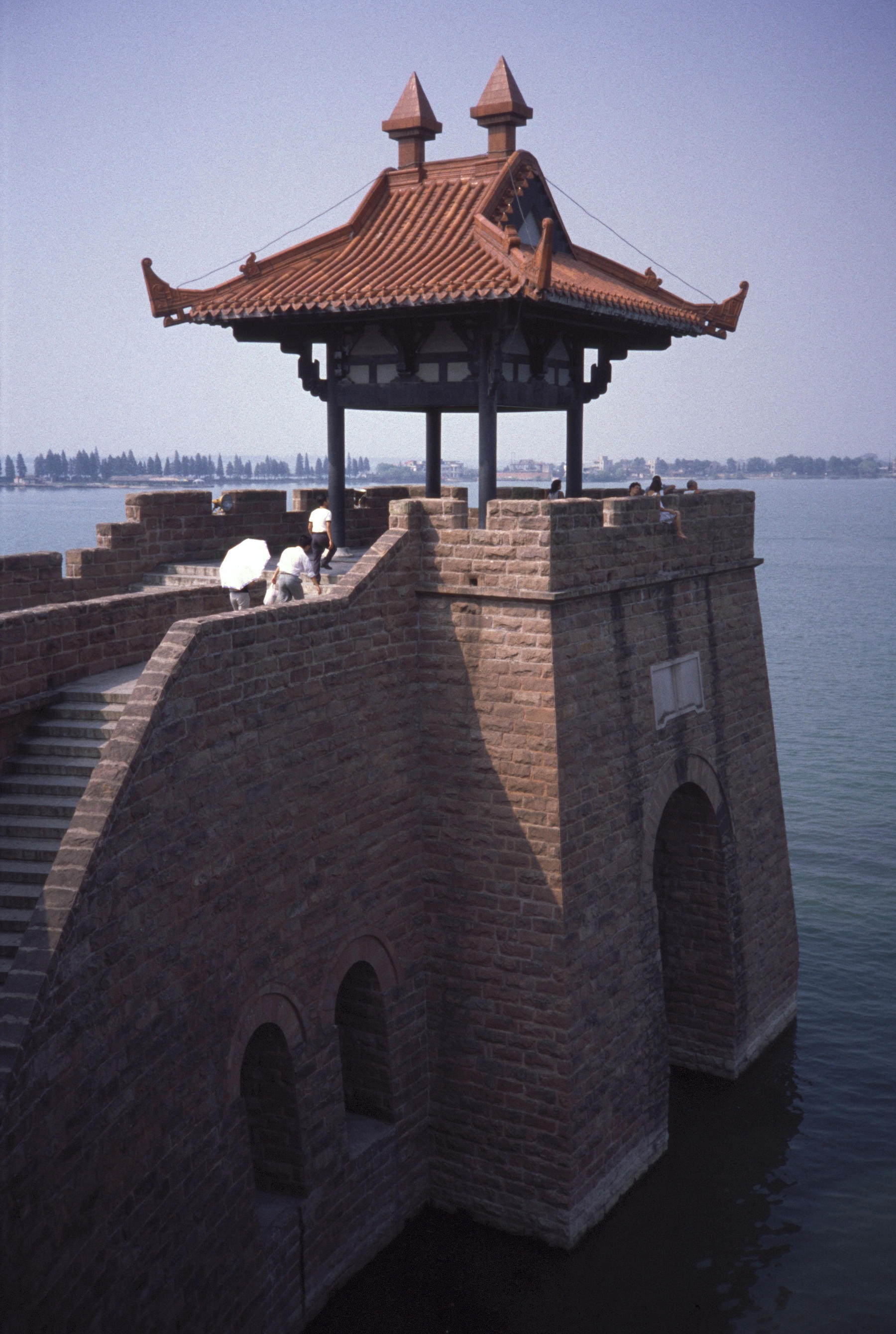
In the Chu Castle

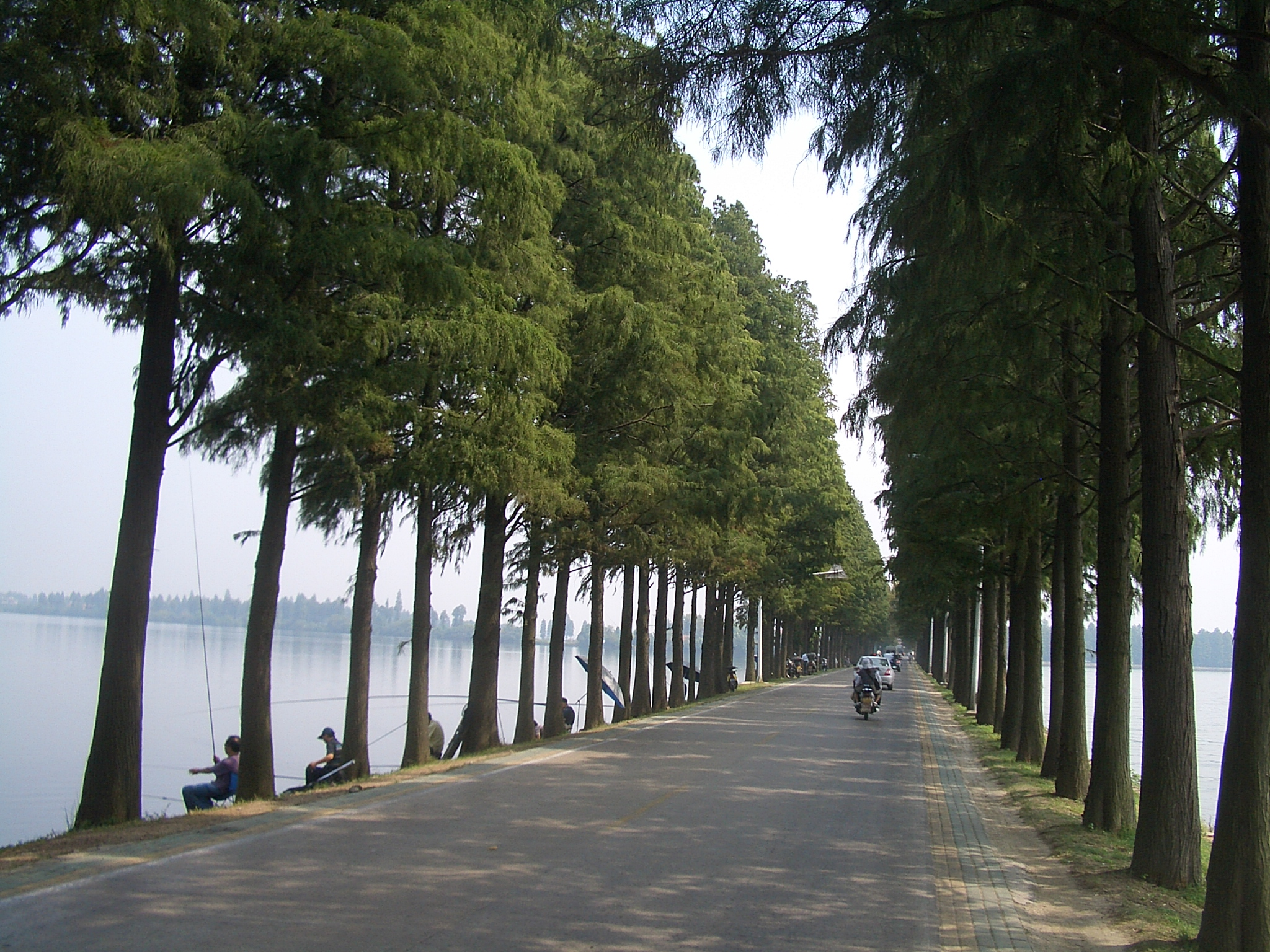
On one of the causeways

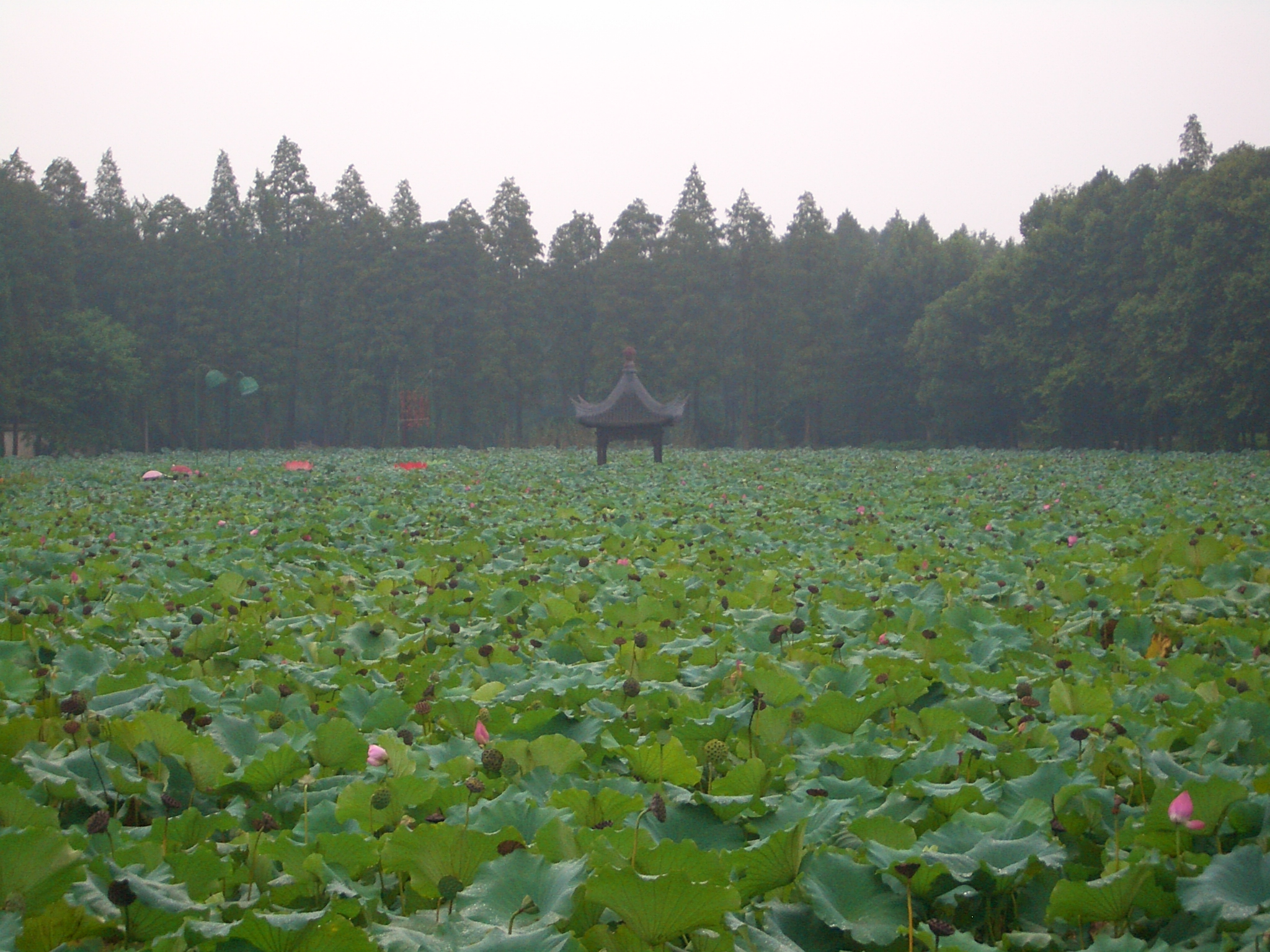
A lotus pond near the botanical garden - the lotus seed ripening season

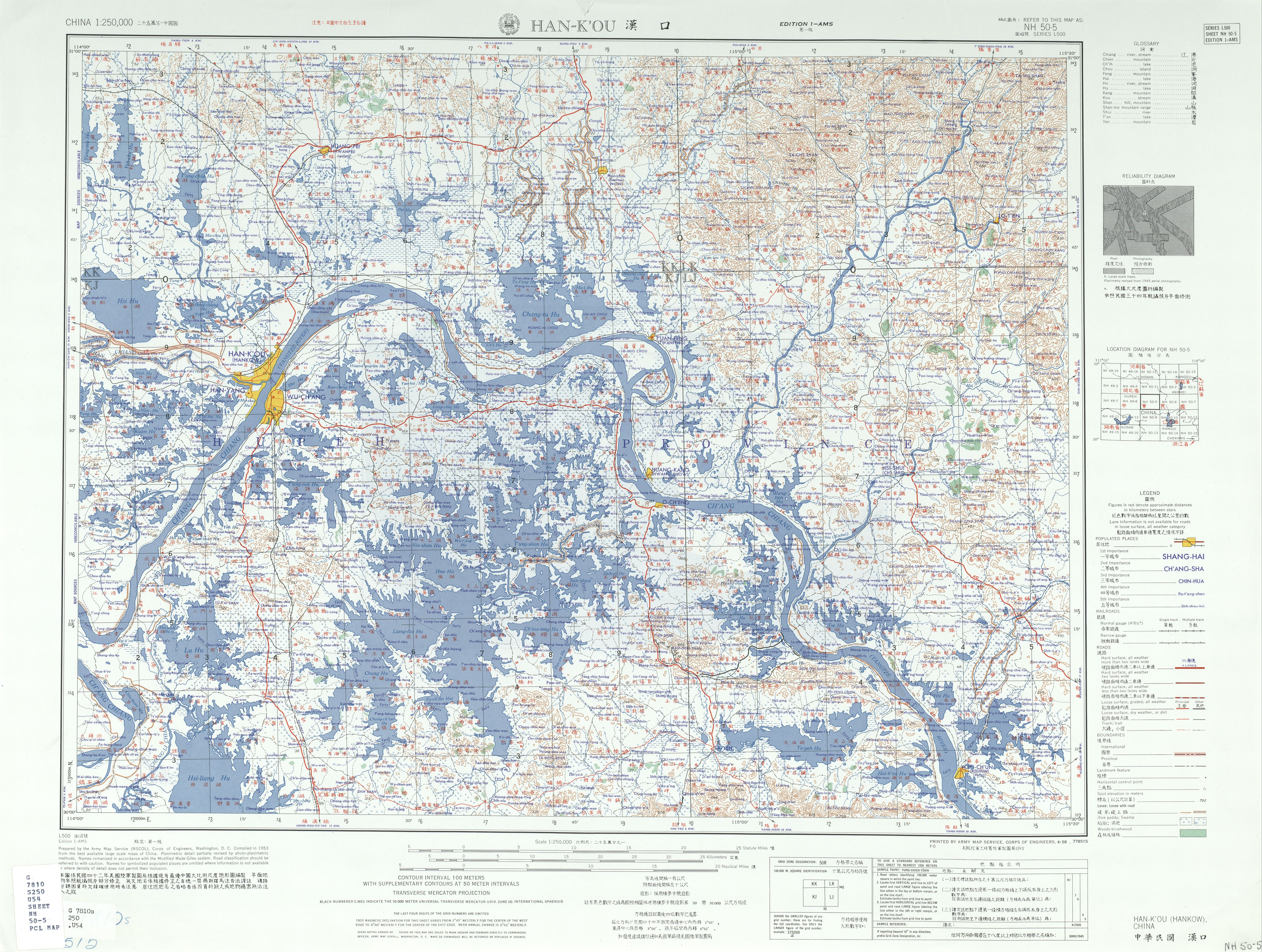
Map including East Lake (labeled as Kuo-cheng Hu 郭鄭湖) in 1953 (not to be confused with the East Lake in Dongxihu District)

== Fishing ==
The East Lake has long been used by local fishermen. According to the 1977 statistics, the annual fish yield of the 1500-hectare fishing area of the lake ("The East lake Fish Farm") was 450 kg/ha. The introduction of better fish management techniques have allowed the yields to increase in the following decade, with 1840 tons by 1995.

The main species with which the lake is stocked are the silver carp and the bighead carp.
