= Longwangtang Reservoir =

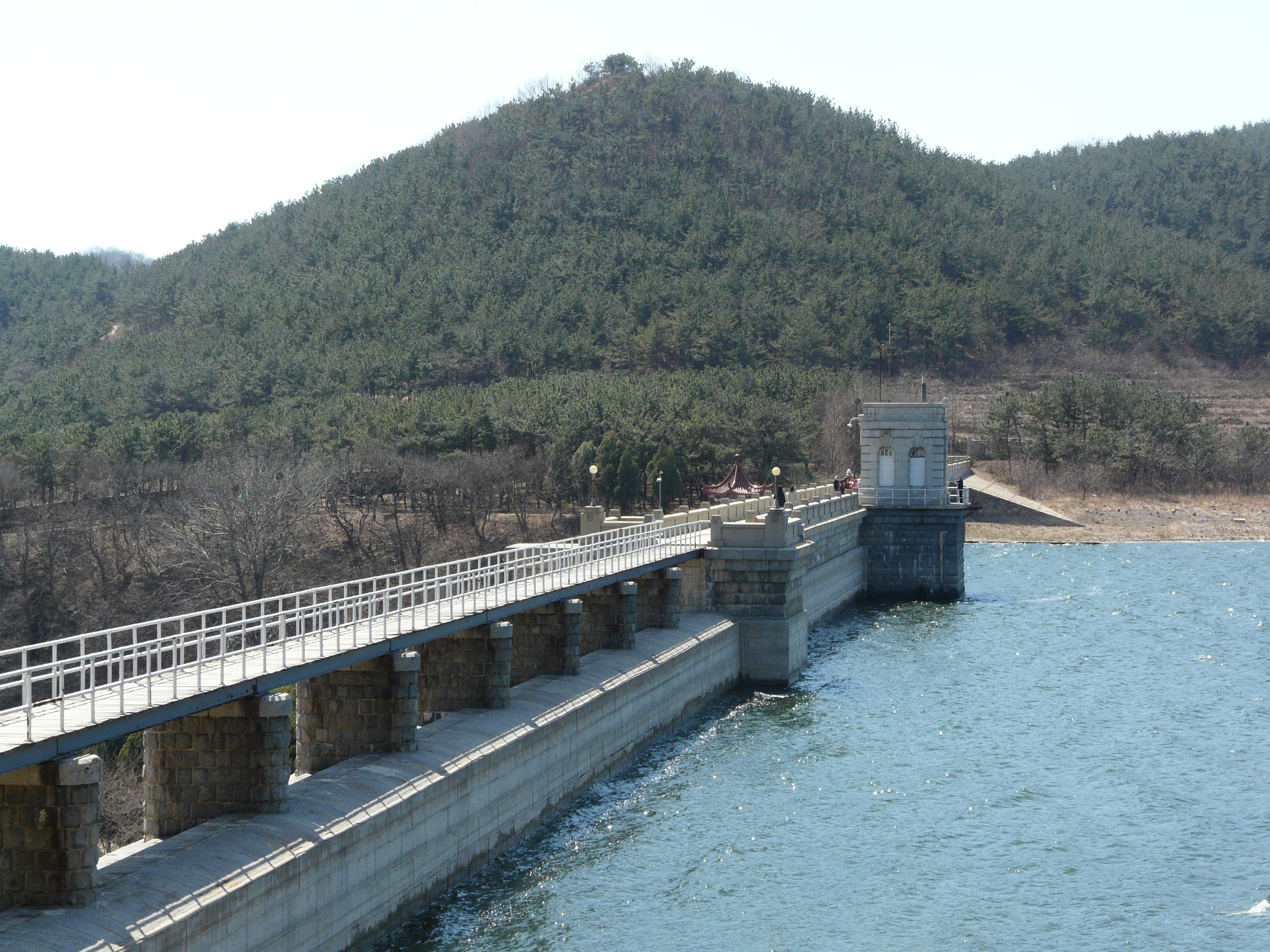
- Longwangtang Reservoir
- Location: Guanfang Village, Longwangtang Street, Lyushunkou District, Dalian City, Liaoning Province
- Construction began: August 1920
- Built by: Japanese

Longwangtang Reservoir (simplified Chinese: 龙王塘水库; traditional Chinese: 龍王塘水庫; pinyin: Lóngwáng táng shuǐkù) is a reservoir located on Longwang River in Guanfang Village, Longwangtang Street, Lyushunkou District, Dalian City, Liaoning Province. It was built during the Japanese colonial period in Dalian, with construction starting in August 1920 and completed on March 31, 1924.

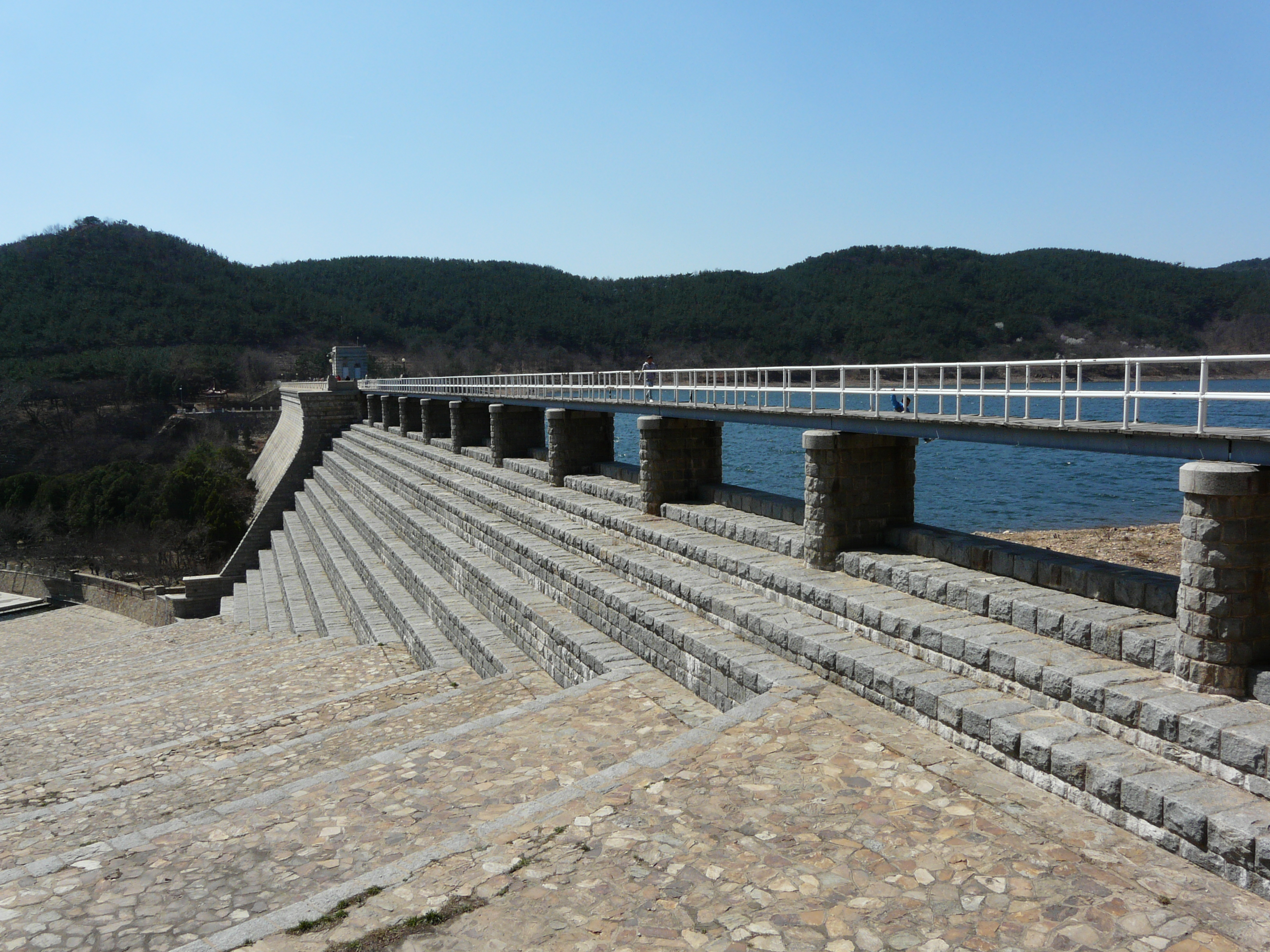

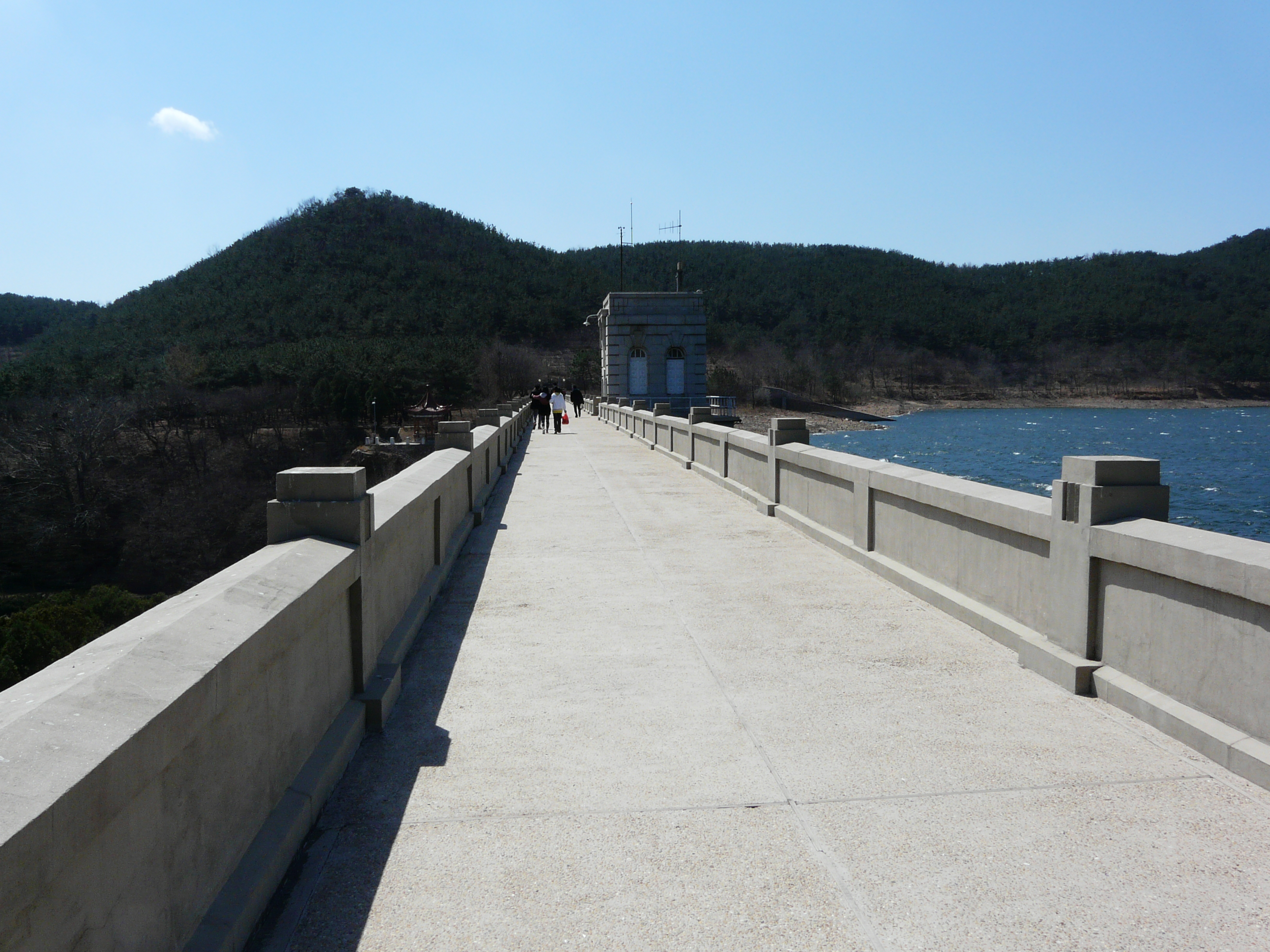

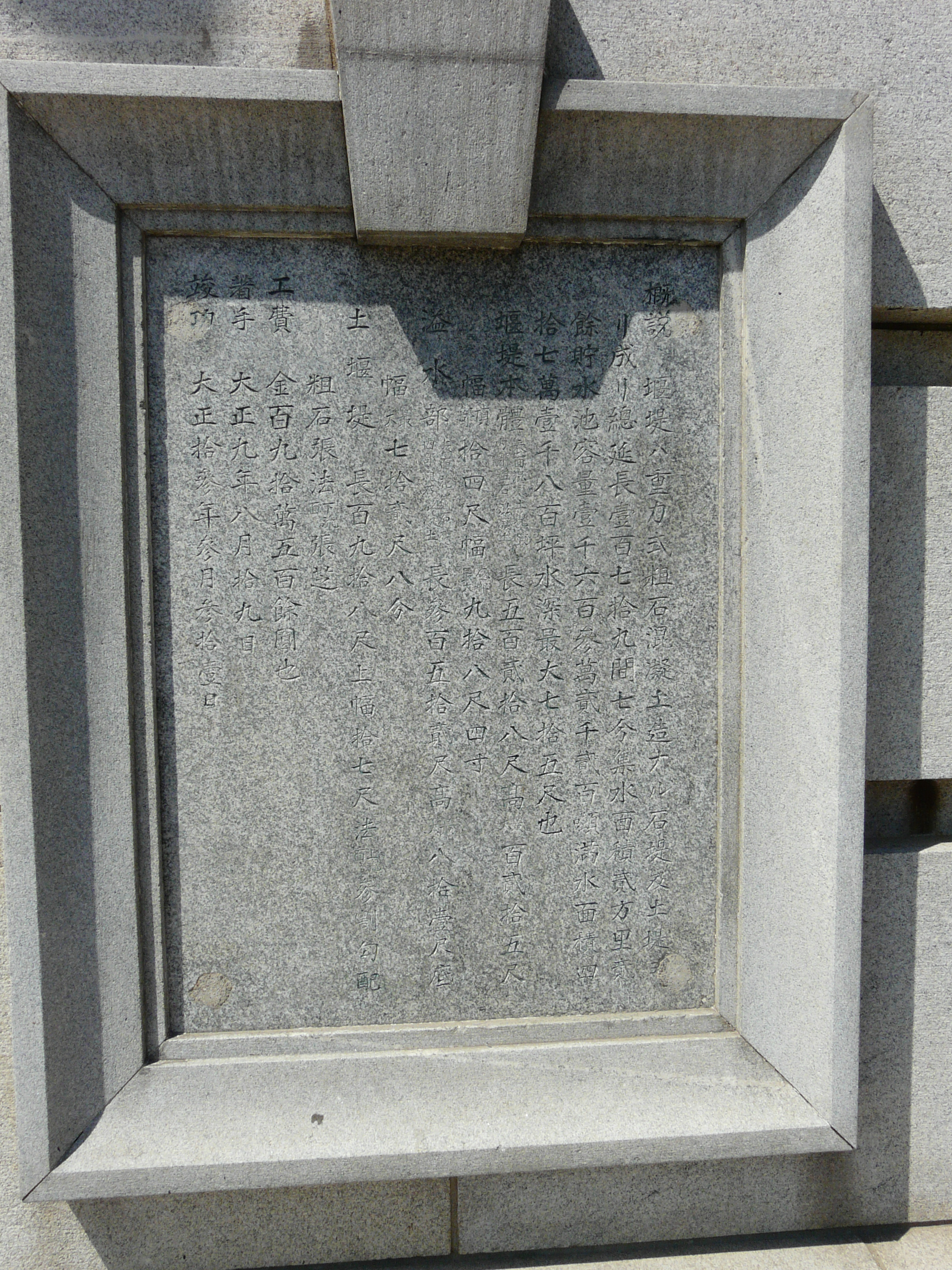

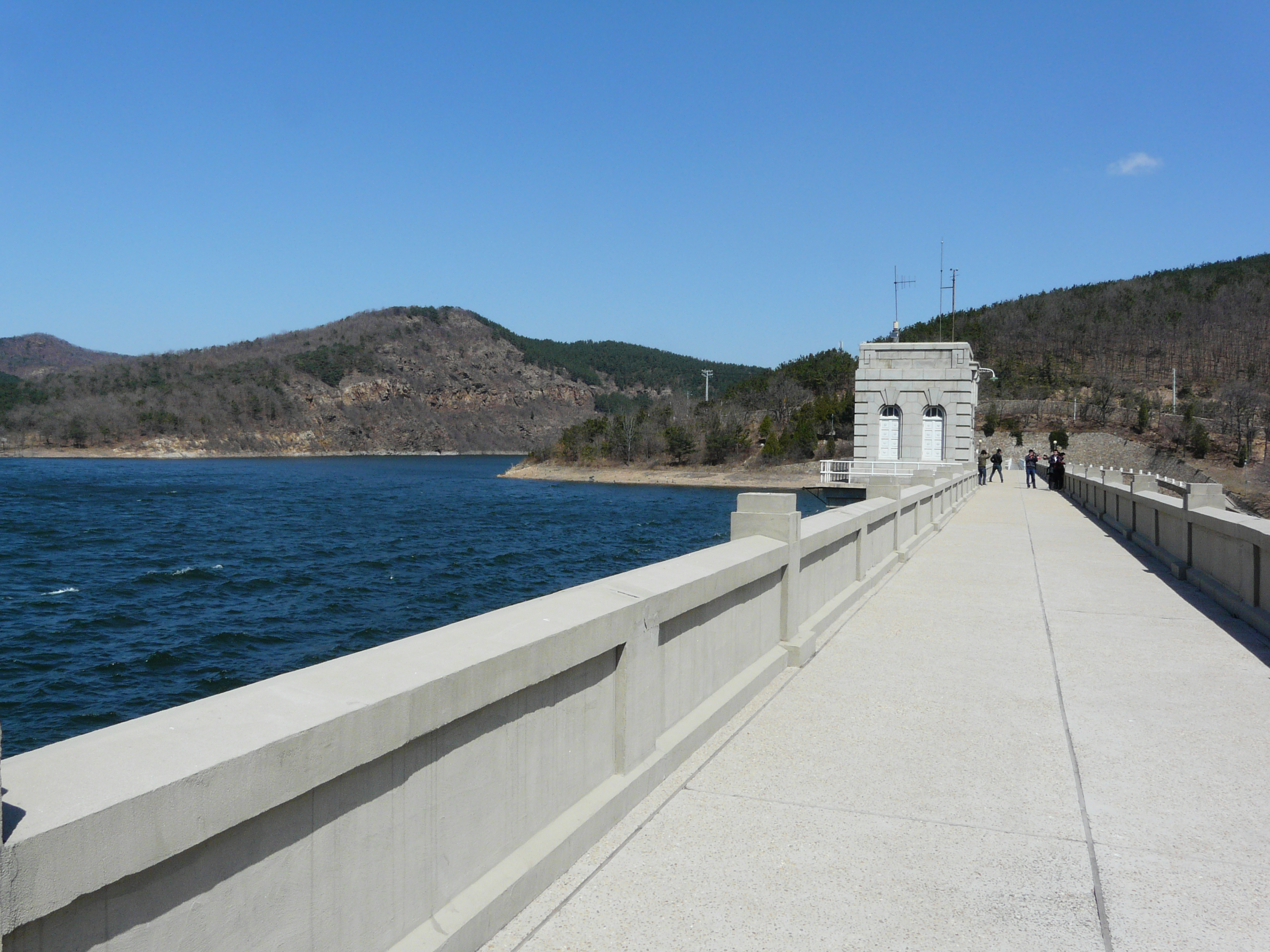

The height of the dam of Longwangtang Reservoir is 33.9 meters and the length is 326.6 meters. On one side of the dam is a 33.9-square-kilometer pond; on the other side is a huge 5,000 square meter garden, the Longwangtang Cherry Blossom Park, with over 3000 trees of cherry blossoms.
