= Qingling Subdistrict =

Qingling Subdistrict 青菱街道
- Subdistrict
- Location of Qingling Subdistrict in Hubei
- Coordinates: 30°29′1″N 114°16′28″E
- Country: China
- Province: Hubei
- Prefecture-level city: Wuhan
- District: Hongshan District

Area
  - Total: 62.5 km^{2} (24.1 sq mi)

Population (2010)
  - Total: 79,913
- Time zone: UTC+8 (China Standard)

Qingling Subdistrict (Chinese: 青菱街道; pinyin: Qīnglíng Jiēdào) is a subdistrict in Hongshan District, Wuhan, Hubei, China.
