= Longwangtang Cherry Blossom Park =

Park in Dalian, China

Coordinates: 38.8420753°N 121.3988807°E

- 龙王塘樱花园
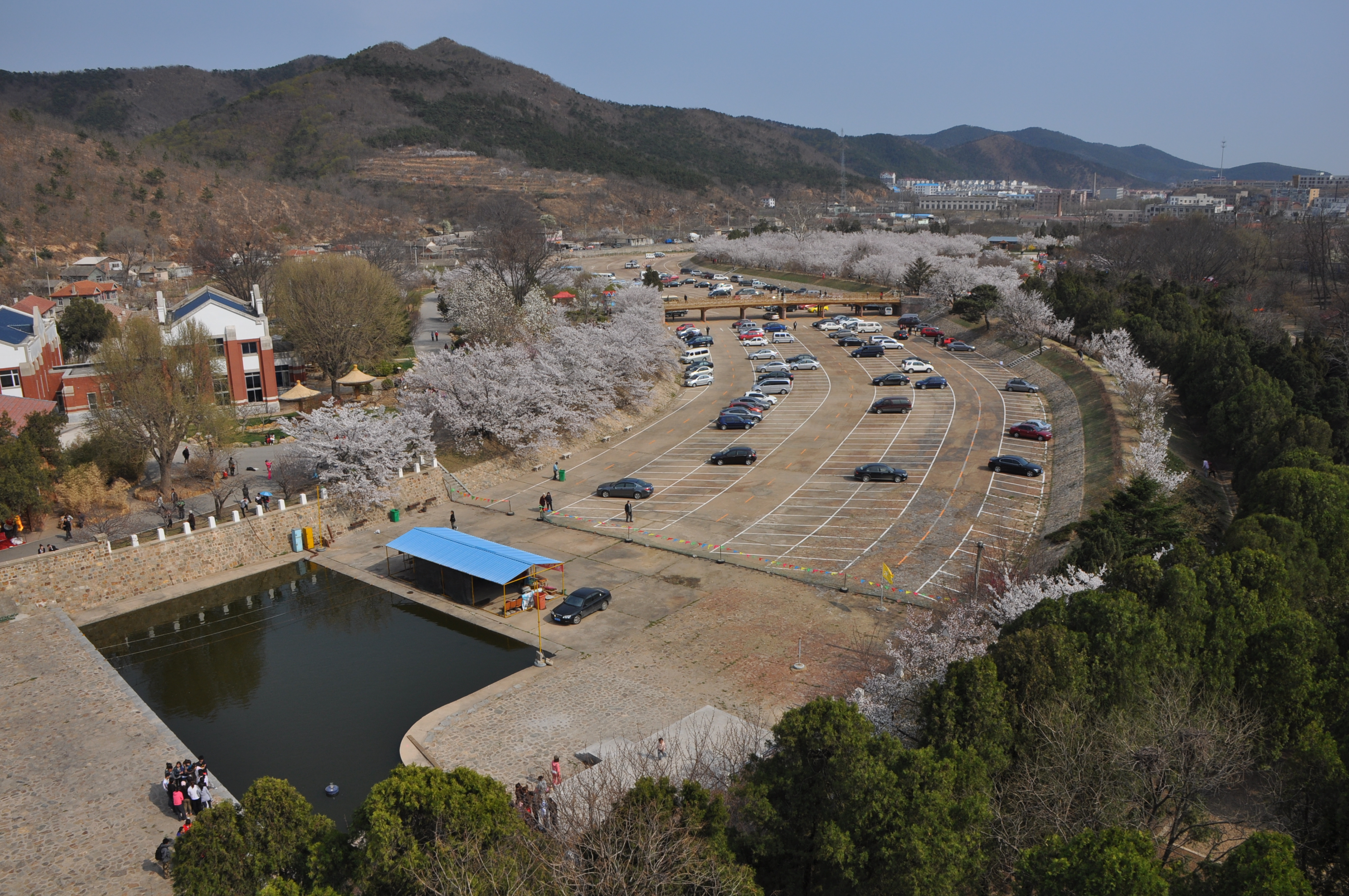
- Interactive map of Longwangtang Cherry Blossom Park
- Location: Dalian, Liaoning Province, China
- Area: 200,000 square metres (49 acres)
- Established: 1926
- Open: 8:00 a.m. – 5:00 p.m. daily
- Terrain: Hilly
- Water: Longwangtang Reservoir
- Plants: 3000+ cherry blossom trees

Longwangtang Cherry Blossom Park (Chinese: 龙王塘樱花园; pinyin: Lóngwángtáng Yīnghuāyuán) is a park in Longwangtang Subdistrict, Lüshunkou District, Dalian, Liaoning Province, China.

The cherry trees, planted downstream from the Longwangtang Dam built by the occupying Japanese in 1921, come into full bloom in late April. It is one of the two most famous cherry blossom parks in China, the other being East Lake Cherry Blossom Park in Wuhan, Hubei.

== Gallery ==
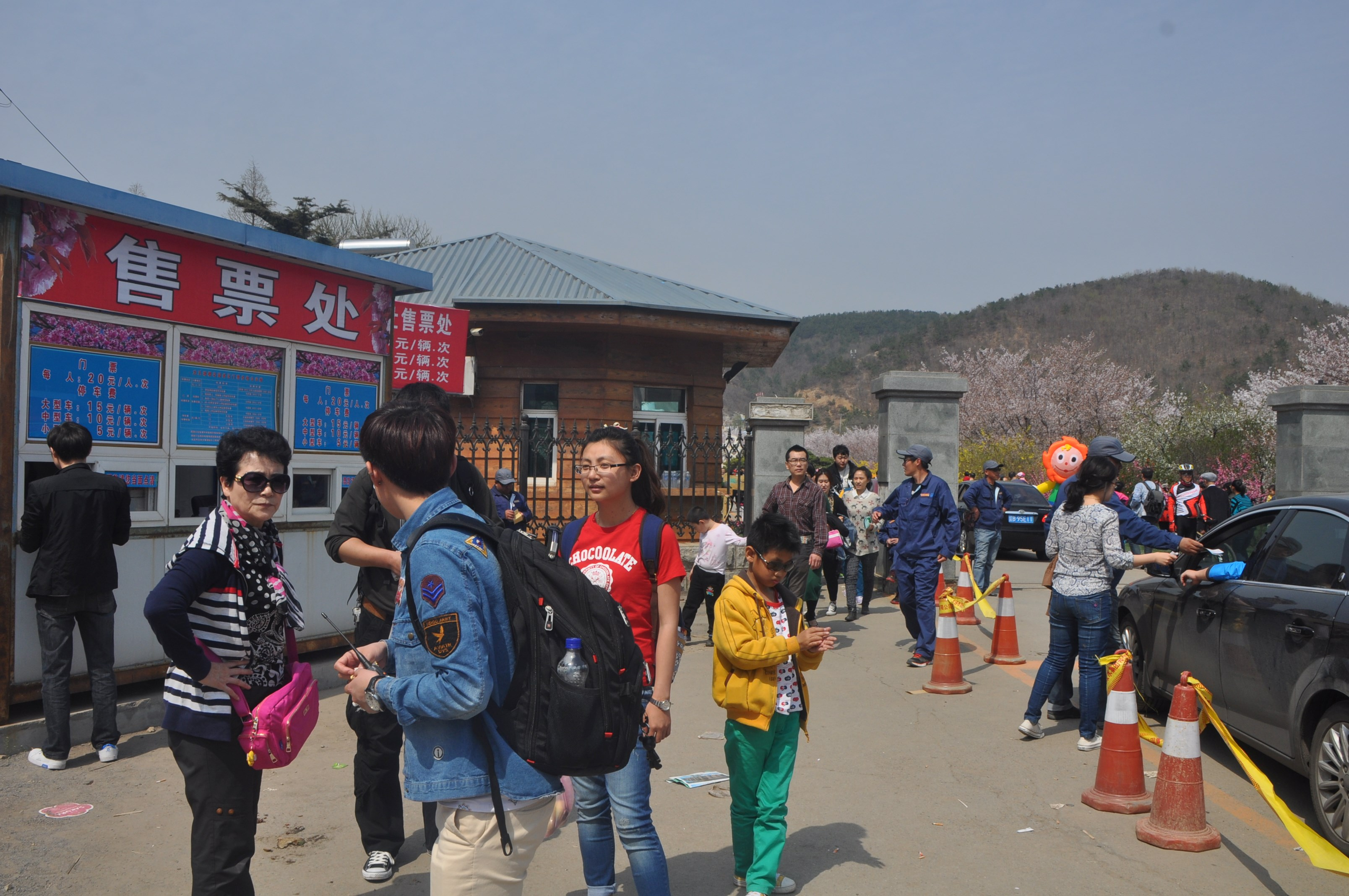
The busy park entrance

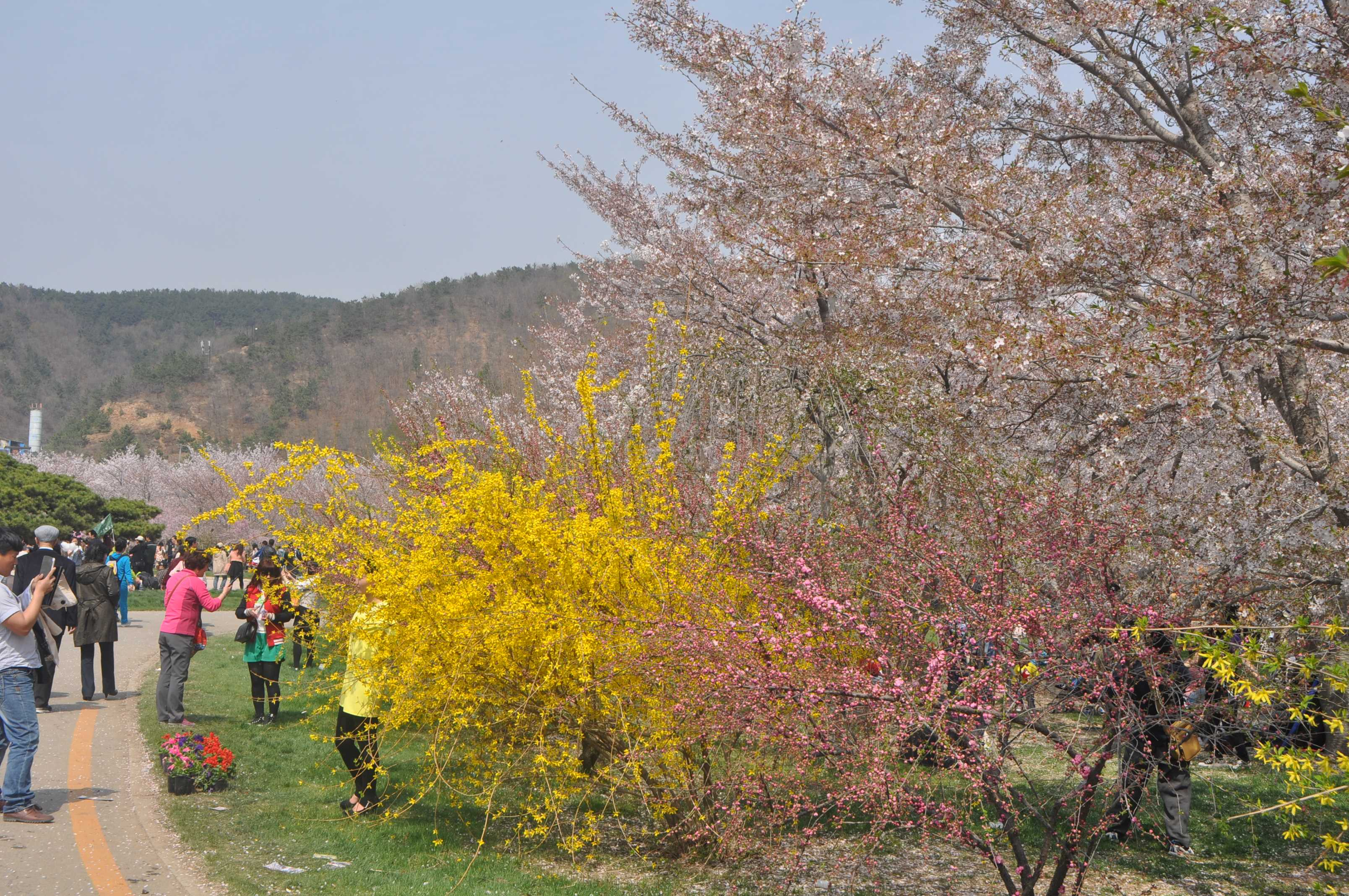
The cherry blossoms come after the yellow winter jasmine.

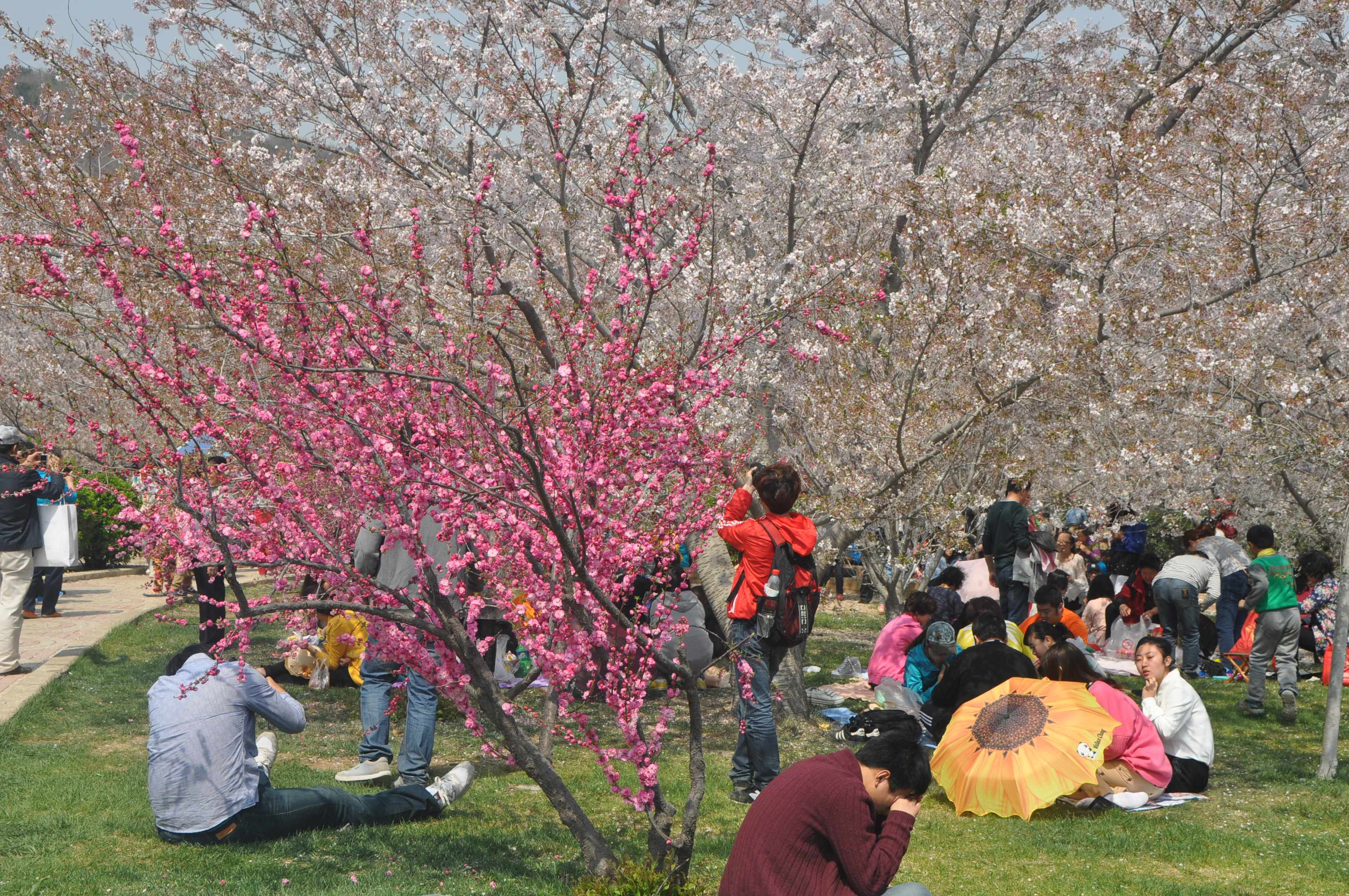
The Dalianites love to eat & drink under the cherry blossoms,

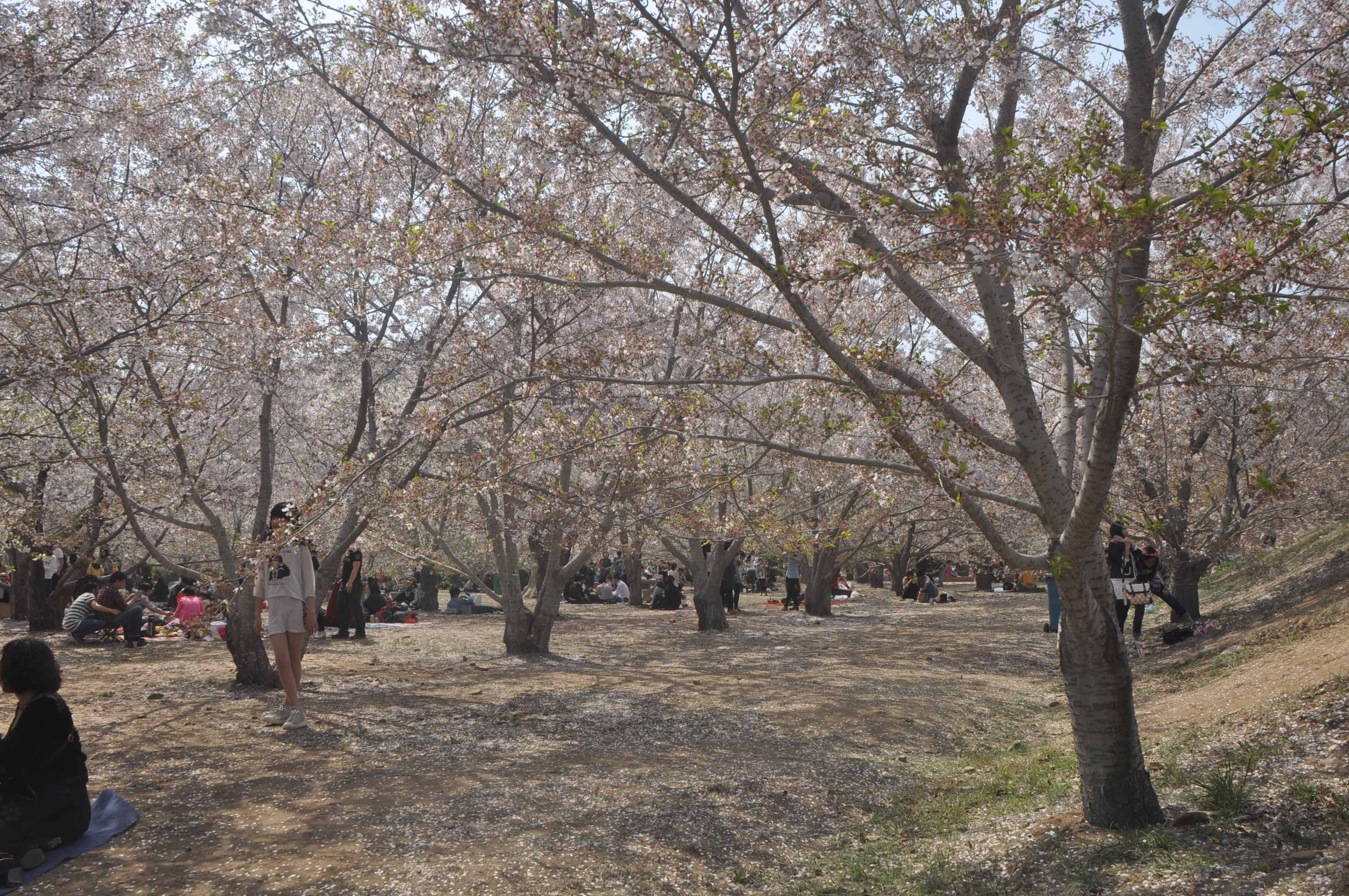
The Dalianites sometimes sing & dance under the cherry blossoms.

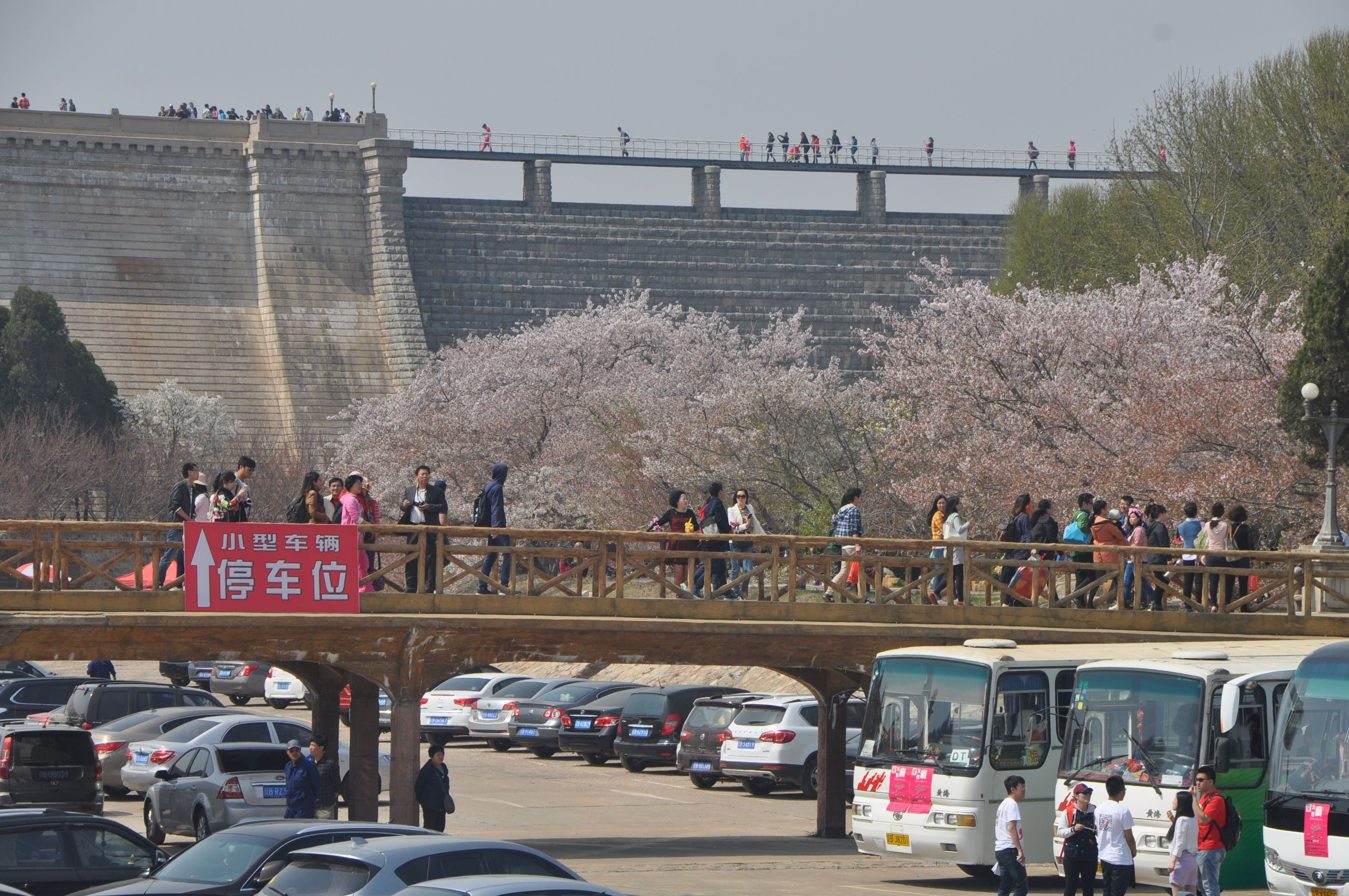
A bridge connects the cherry tree sites on both side of the parking lot.

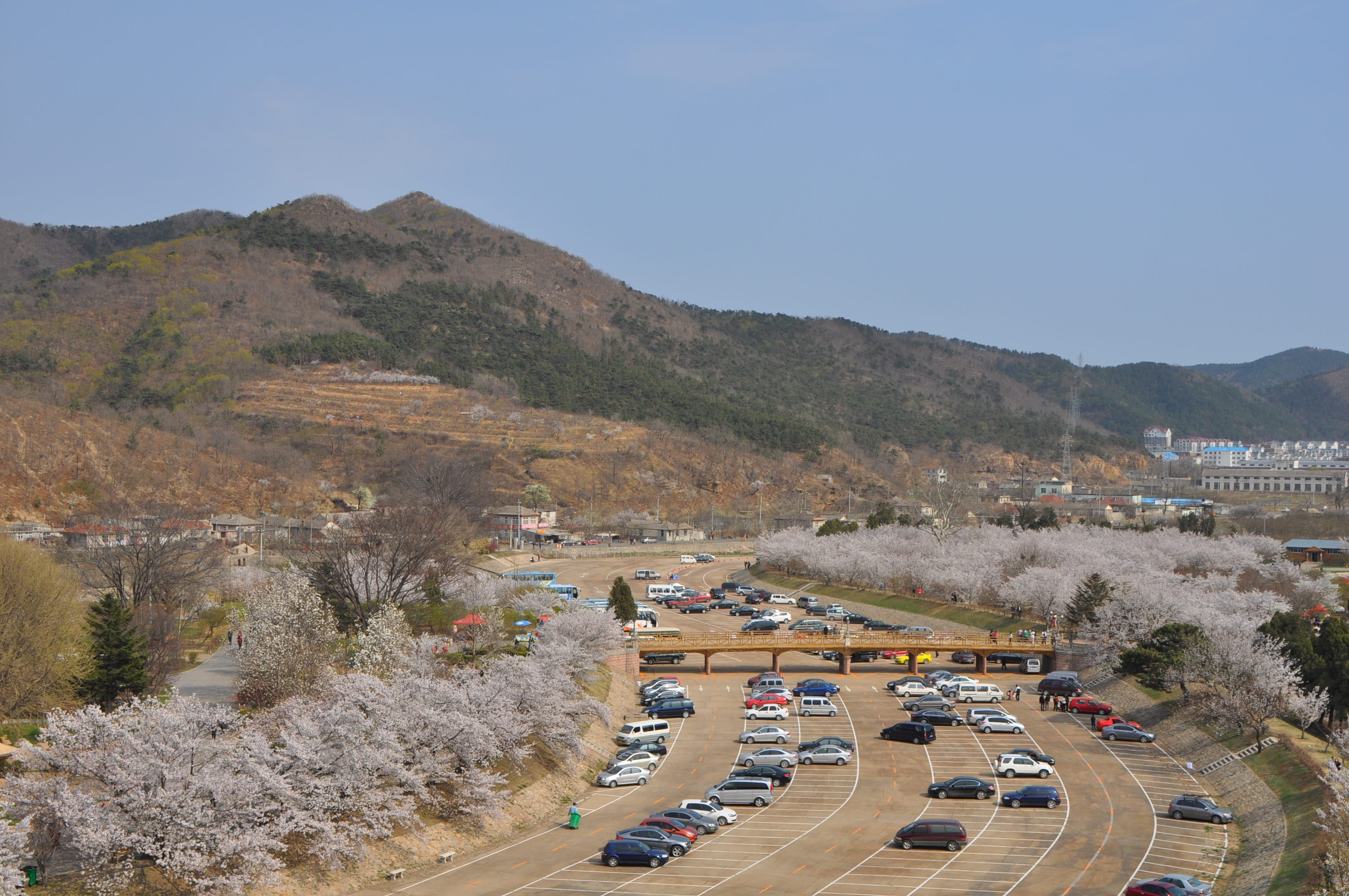
Looking over the cherry blossoms from the Longwangtang Dam

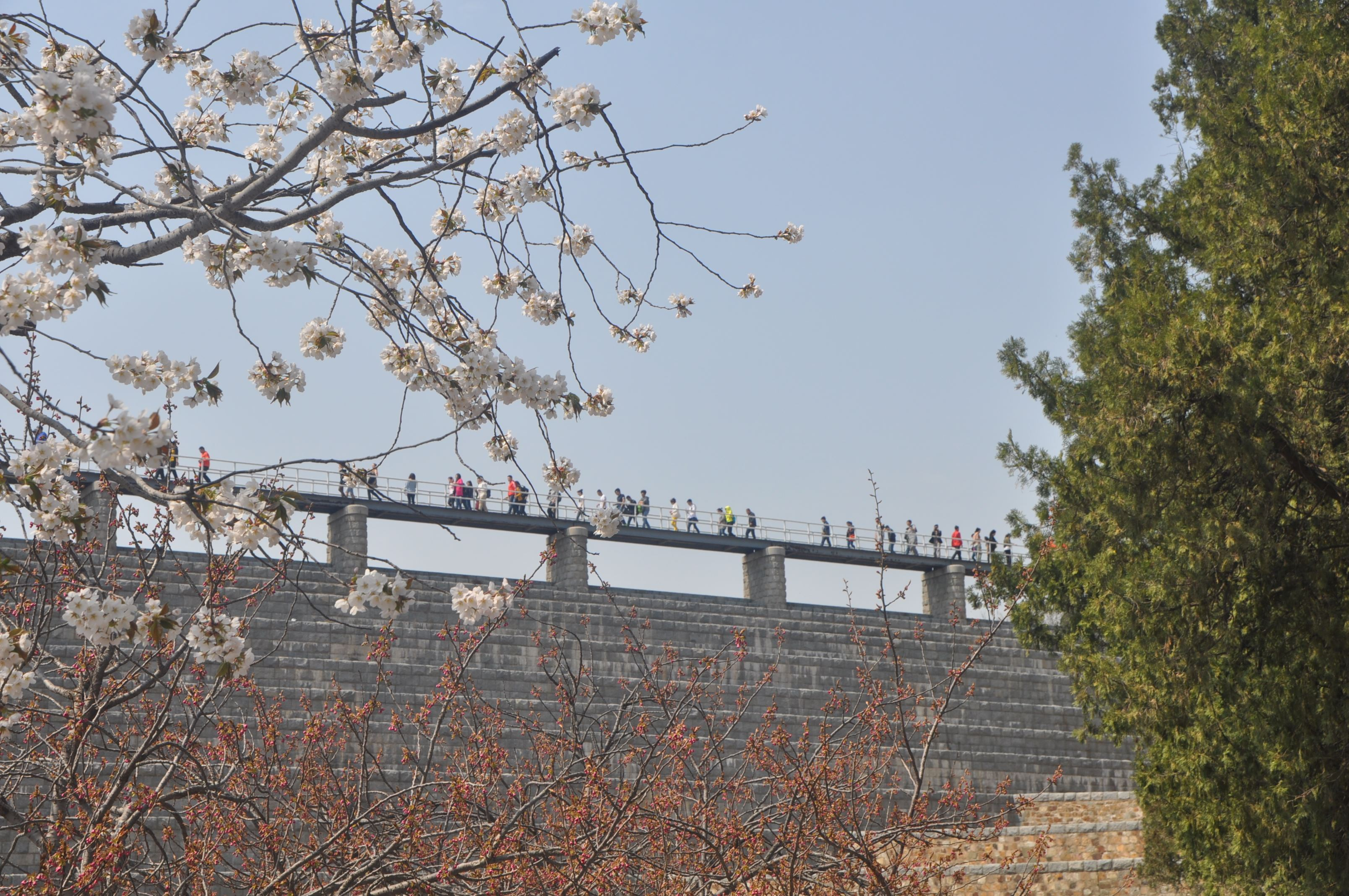
With the dam in the background

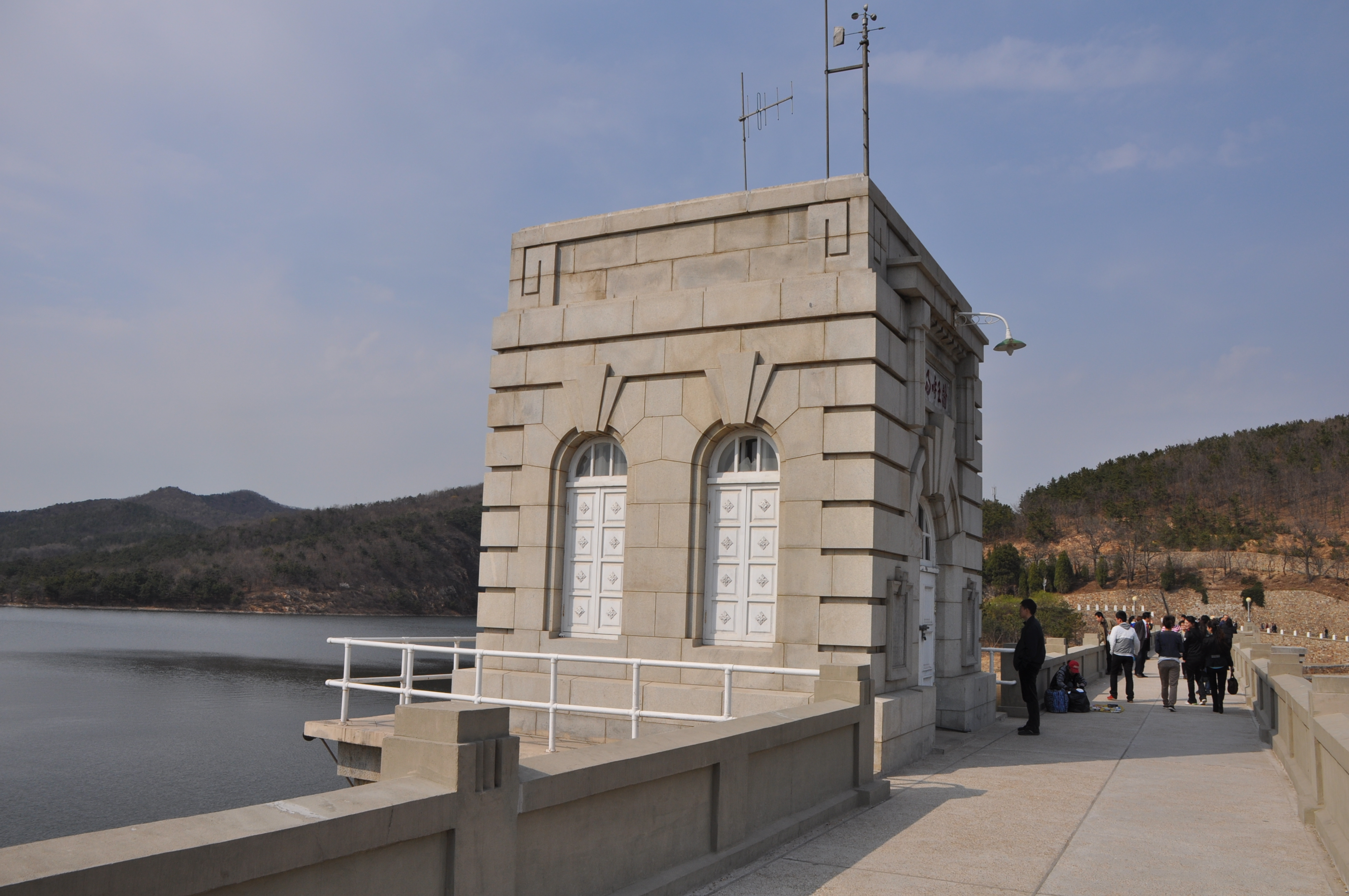
Walking on the dam

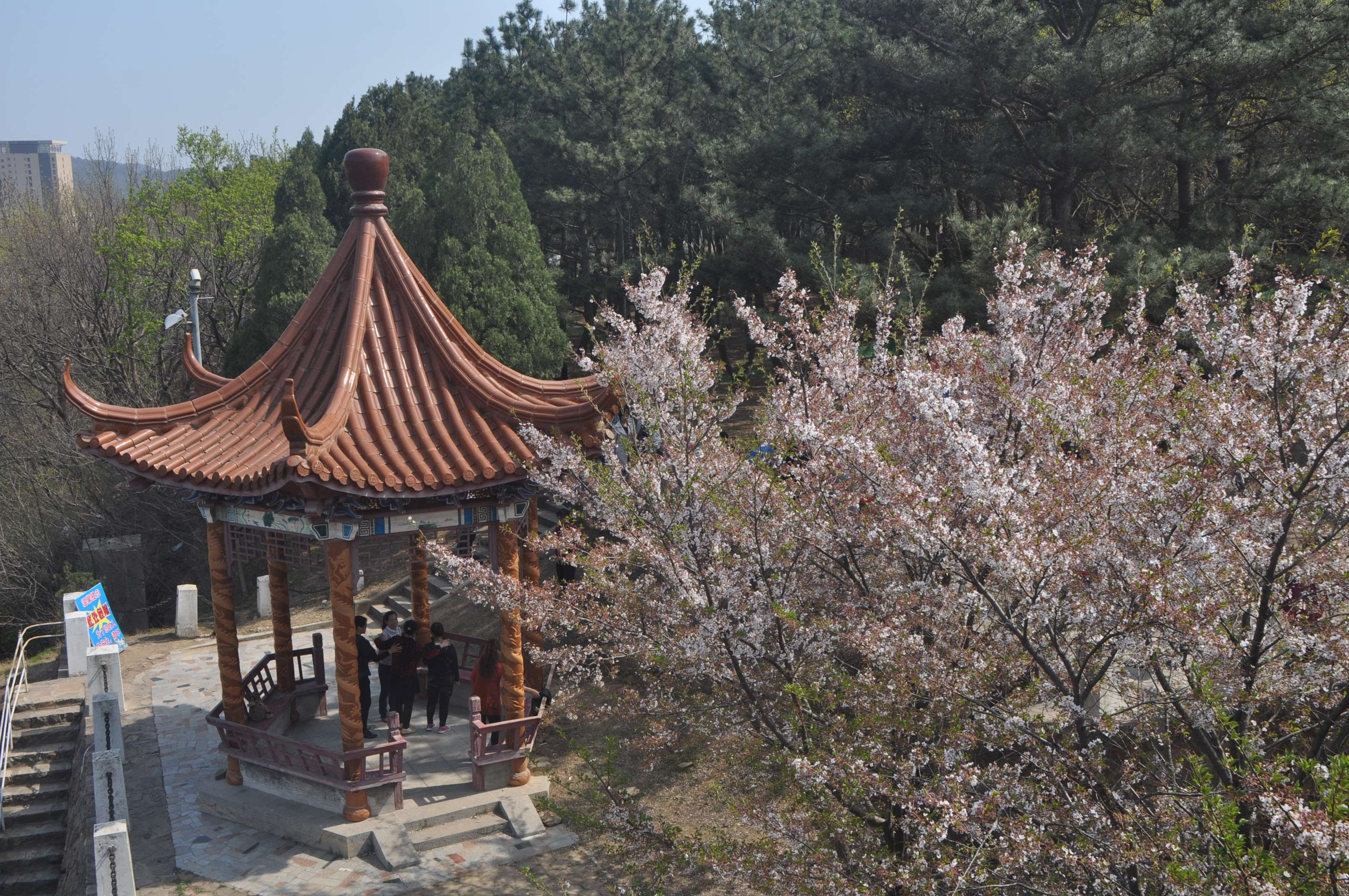
A pavilion on the right bank of the dam

== See also ==
- East Lake Cherry Blossom Park
- Lushun South Road
