= Shizishan Subdistrict, Wuhan =

Shizishan Subdistrict 狮子山街道
- Subdistrict
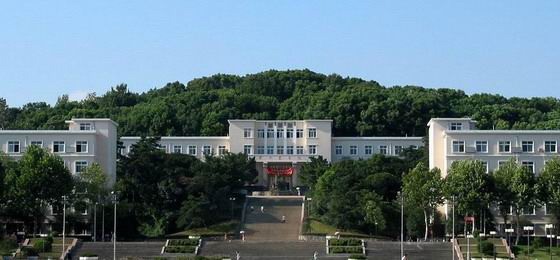
- Main Building of Huazhong Agricultural University on Mount Shizi

- Location in Hubei
- Coordinates: 30°28′35″N 114°20′55″E
- Country: People's Republic of China
- Province: Hubei
- Sub-provincial city: Wuhan
- District: Hongshan
- Village-level divisions: 13 residential communities
- Established: 1961

Area
  - Total: 15.9 km^{2} (6.1 sq mi)

Population (2010)
  - Total: 99,255
  - Density: 6,240/km^{2} (16,200/sq mi)
- Time zone: UTC+8 (China Standard)

Shizishan Subdistrict, Wuhan
- Simplified Chinese: 狮子山街道
- Traditional Chinese: 獅子山街道
Transcriptions

Shizishan Subdistrict, named after Mount Shizi located in the subdistrict, is a subdistrict in southern Hongshan District, Wuhan, Hubei, China. To the east it borders the Shizitou South Lake Bridge across from Zhongnan University of Economics and Law; to the south it borders Liqiao Fishery on the southern shore of Yezhi Lake and Hongshan Subdistrict; to the west it reaches Wunan Station on the Beijing–Guangzhou railway and Zhangjiawan Subdistrict; to the north it reaches South Lake's Liantong Port on Xunsi River. Huazhong Agricultural University and the main campus of Hubei University of Technology are located in the subdistrict.

== History ==
Shizishan Subdistrict was established in 1961.

In July 1986, Shizishan Subdistrict was transferred from Wuchang District to Hongshan District.

== Geography ==
The western part of the subdistrict is located between two lakes (South Lake and Yezhi Lake) and around the mountain which gives the district its name. Mount Shizi (Chinese: 狮子山; lit. 'Lion Mountain') is so named because it looks like a lion. Mount Shizi reaches 2,800 m (9,186 ft) in height and covers 1000 mu of land with 970 mu covered in forest as of 2016. In 2015, a public greenway path was laid out around Mount Shizi. In 1957, Huazhong Agricultural University was built around Mount Shizi, the mountain from which the subdistrict takes its name.

== Administrative divisions ==
As of 2017, Shizishan Subdistrict administers thirteen residential communities:

- Huanongdong, Huanongxi, Luoshilu, Shengnongkeyuan, Tonghui, Qiyi'ersuo, Hugong (Hubei University of Technology), Wunantielu, Shinan, Nanhushanzhuang, Meiguiwan, Shuchenglu, Luojiayayuan

Former administrative divisions of the subdistrict include:

- Sanneipei, Huakeyuan, Huakeyuan Nongchang, Wunan, Huanongyiwei, Huanong'erwei, Huanongsanwei, 7011 Gongchang, Canzhongchang, Zhoujiawan, Nanhucun, Dahualing and Wutie

== Demographics ==
Historical population
Year	Pop.	±% p.a.
2000	58,786	—
2010	99,255	+5.38%

As of 1996, the total area of Shizishan Subdistrict was 15.1 km^{2} (6 sq mi). Including both long-term residents, college students and laborers, the population is estimated to reach 180,000.

== Transportation ==
Shizishan Subdistrict is served by several stations at the southern terminus of Wuhan Metro Line 7. Shizishan Subdistrict is located north of the Third Ring Road.
