= Hongshan, Wuhan =

District in Hubei, China

Hongshan 洪山区
- District
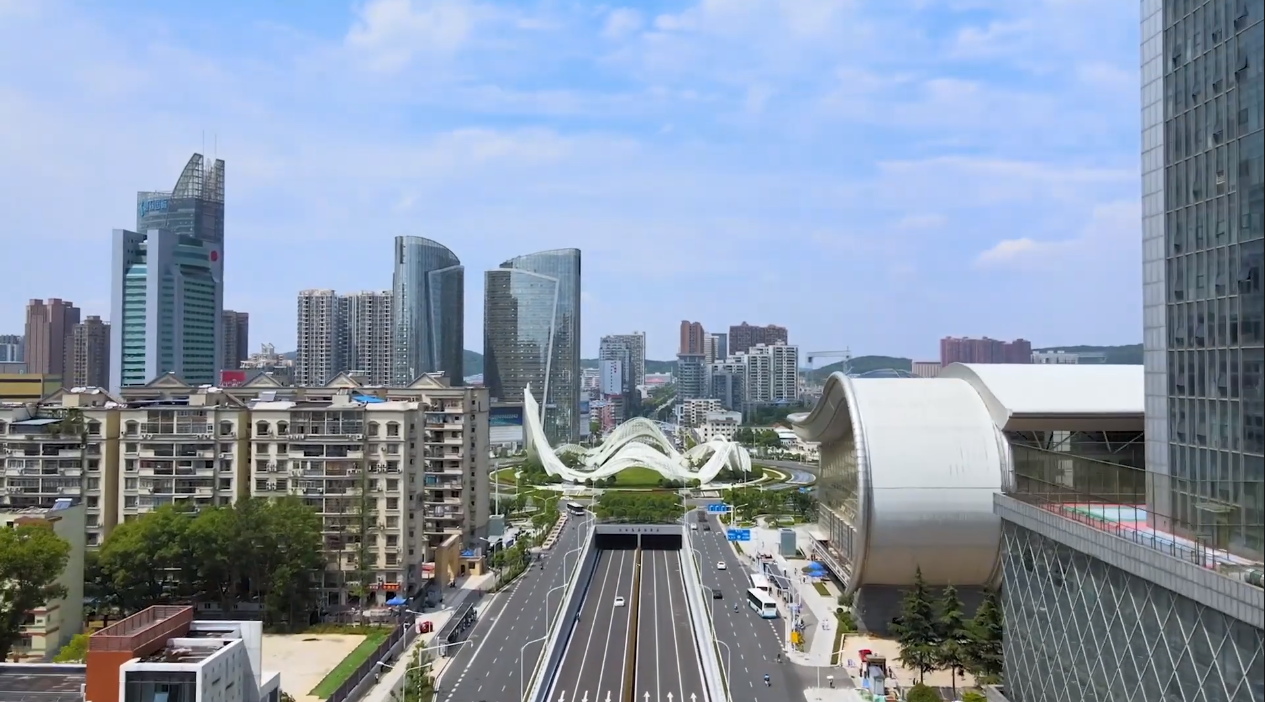
- Optics Valley Square
- Interactive map of Hongshan
- Location in Hubei
- Coordinates: 30°32′16″N 114°24′25″E
- Country: People's Republic of China
- Province: Hubei
- Sub-provincial city: Wuhan
- Established date: 1949; reestablished 1955; 1961

Area
  - Total: 480.20 km^{2} (185.41 sq mi)
- Elevation: 25.3 m (83 ft)
- Highest elevation: 201 m (659 ft)
- Lowest elevation: 17.3 m (57 ft)

Population (2020)
  - Total: 2,554,403
  - Density: 5,319.5/km^{2} (13,777/sq mi)
- Time zone: UTC+8 (China Standard)
- Postal code: 430070
- Area code: 0027
- Website: www.hongshan.gov.cn

Hongshan, Wuhan
- Simplified Chinese: 洪山区
- Traditional Chinese: 洪山區
Transcriptions
Standard Mandarin
- Hanyu Pinyin: Hóngshān Qū

Hongshan District (Chinese: 洪山区; pinyin: Hóngshān Qū) is one of 13 urban districts of the prefecture-level city of Wuhan, the capital of Hubei Province, China. The district is named for Mount Hong, located near East Lake. It is the most populous of all the districts, and is the most spacious but least densely populated among the city's seven core districts.

== Geography ==
The district is located primarily on the right bank of the Yangtze River but also includes Tianxing Island (天兴洲) and White Sand Island (白沙洲) which are in the Yangtze River. The district borders Wuchang and Qingshan to the north and Jiangxia District to the south; it administers the southern bank of the Yangtze, eastern half of East Lake and the northwest of Tangxun Lake; on the left bank it borders, from west to east, Caidian, Hanyang, Jiang'an, Huangpi, and Xinzhou. The district also borders Huarong District, part of the prefecture-level city of Ezhou. There are several mountains in Hongshan District including Mount Hong (洪山) and Mount Yujia (喻家山/瑜珈山).

=== Administrative divisions ===
The district contains at least 9 subdistricts and 1 township:

NBS Area No.	Name (from Mand.)	Chinese (Simp.)	Pinyin	Population (2010)	Area (km^{2})
420111001000	Luonan Subdistrict	珞南街道	Luònán Jiēdào	230,583	13
420111002000	Guanshan Subdistrict	关山街道	Guānshān Jiēdào	314,096	34
420111003000	Shizishan Subdistrict	狮子山街道	Shīzishān Jiēdào	99,255	14
420111004000	Zhangjiawan Subdistrict	张家湾街道	Zhāngjiāwān Jiēdào	27,028	26
420111005000	Liyuan Subdistrict	梨园街道	Líyuán Jiēdào	22,384	3.76
420111006000	Zhuodaoquan Subdistrict	卓刀泉街道	Zhuódāoquán Jiēdào	established in Nov 2010	
420111007000	Hongshan Subdistrict	洪山街道	Hóngshān Jiēdào	164,992	62
420111008000	Heping Subdistrict	和平街道	Hépíng Jiēdào	107,811	42
420111009000	Qingling Subdistrict	青菱街道	Qīnglíng Jiēdào	79,913	62.5
420111205000	Tianxing Township (T'ien-hsing-chou)	天兴乡	Tiānxing Xiāng	3,368	26
420111460000	Qingtanhu	清潭湖/清谭湖办事处	Qīngtánhú Bànshìchù	6,438	
420111491000	East Lake Scenic Area	东湖风景区街道（洪山）	Dōnghú Fēngjǐngqū Jiēdào	53,110	

== Destinations ==
Happy Valley Wuhan (simplified Chinese: 欢乐谷; traditional Chinese: 歡樂谷; pinyin: Huānlè Gǔ) is a theme park in Hongshan District. Opened on 29 April 2012, it is the fifth installation of the Happy Valley theme park chain.

== Gallery ==
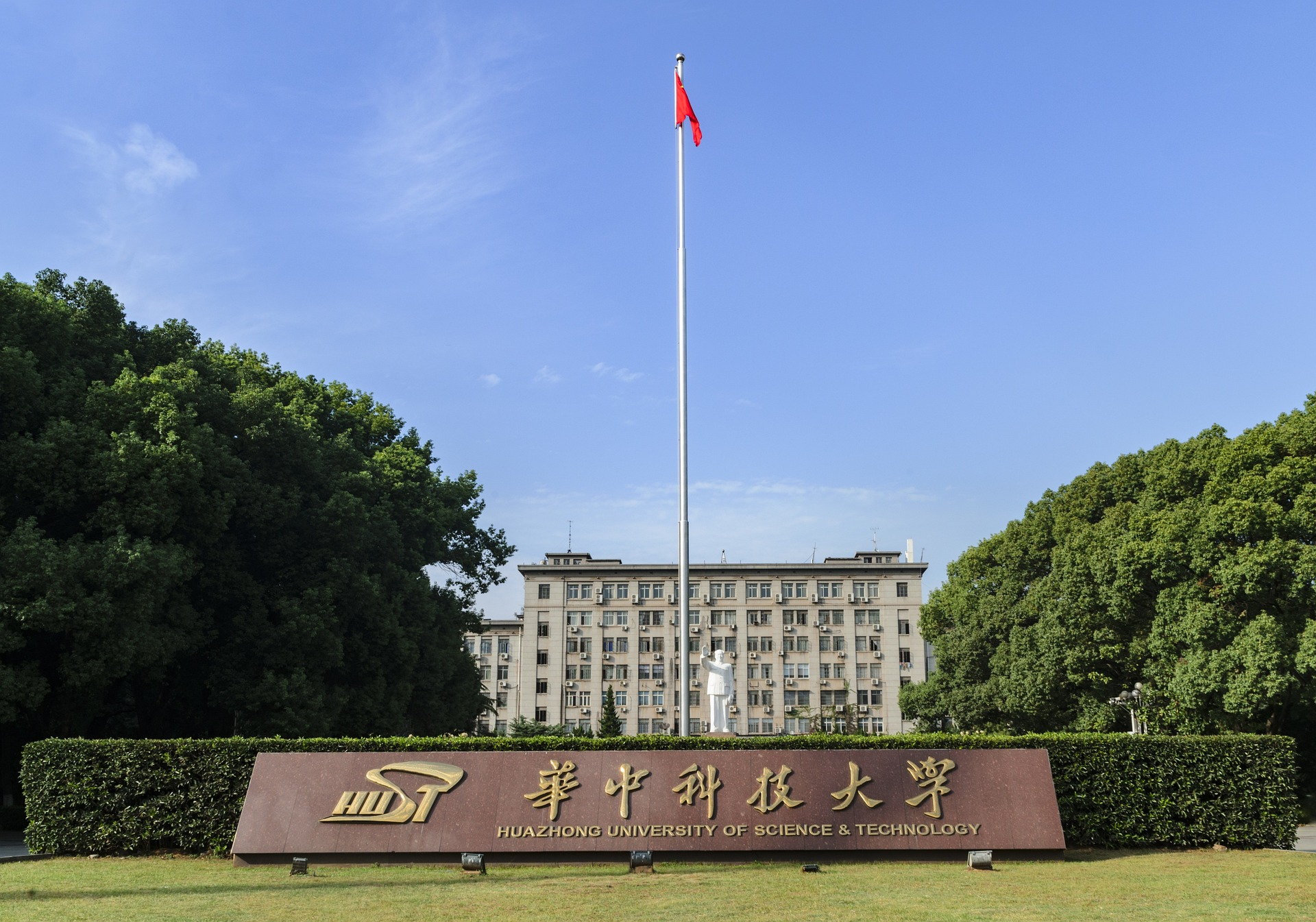
Huazhong University of Science and Technology

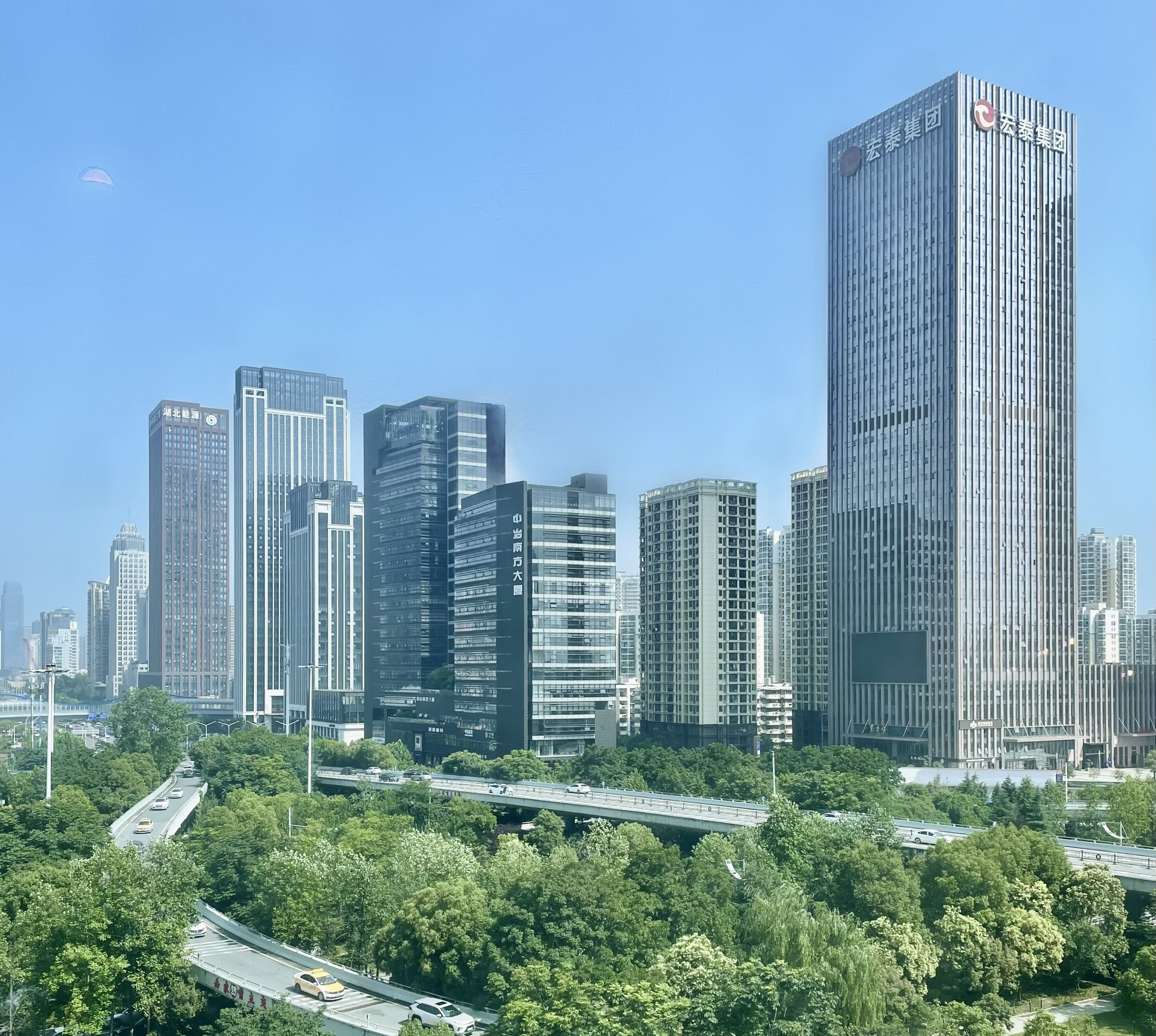
Yuejiazui junction skyine

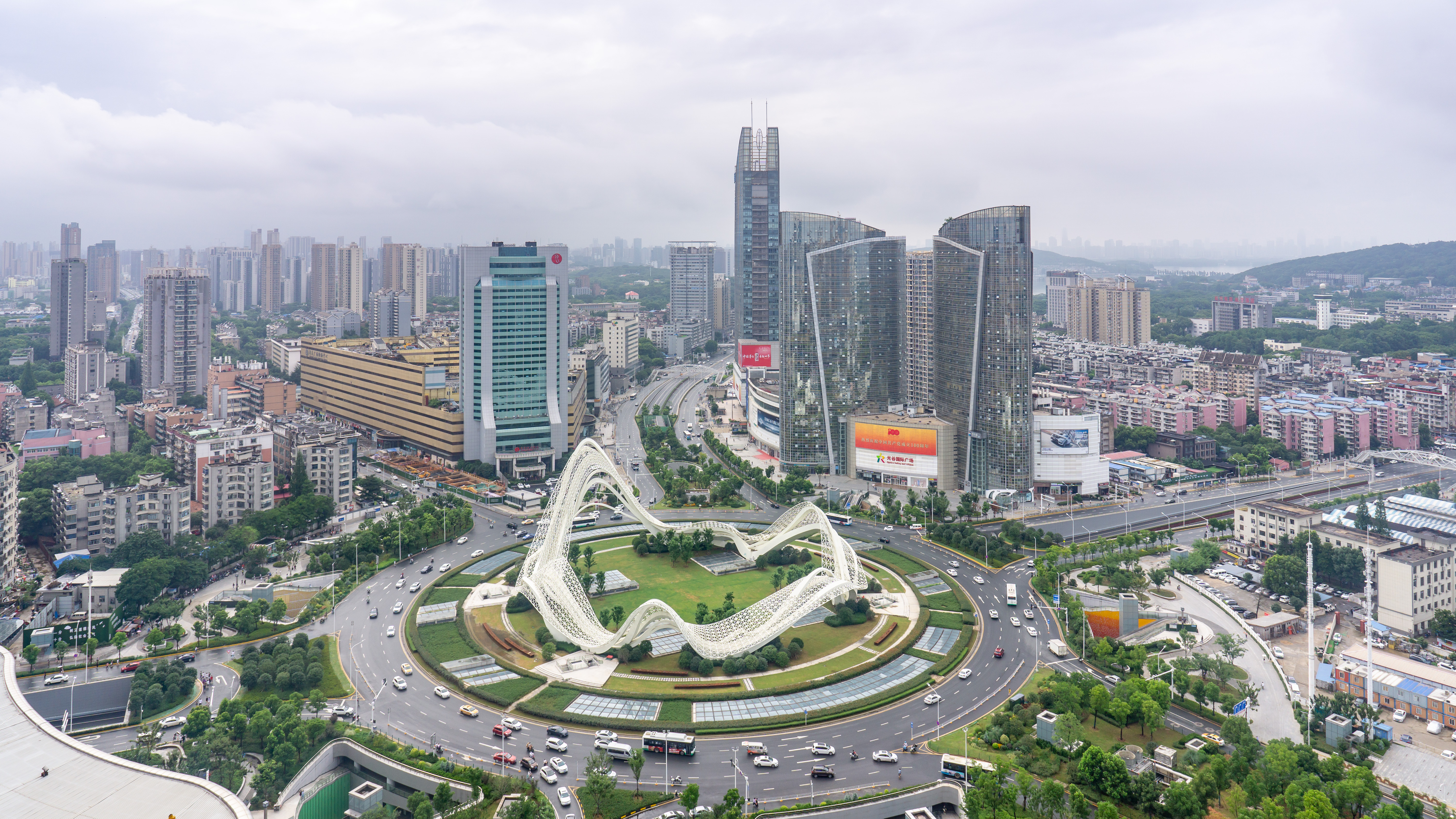
Optics Valley Square

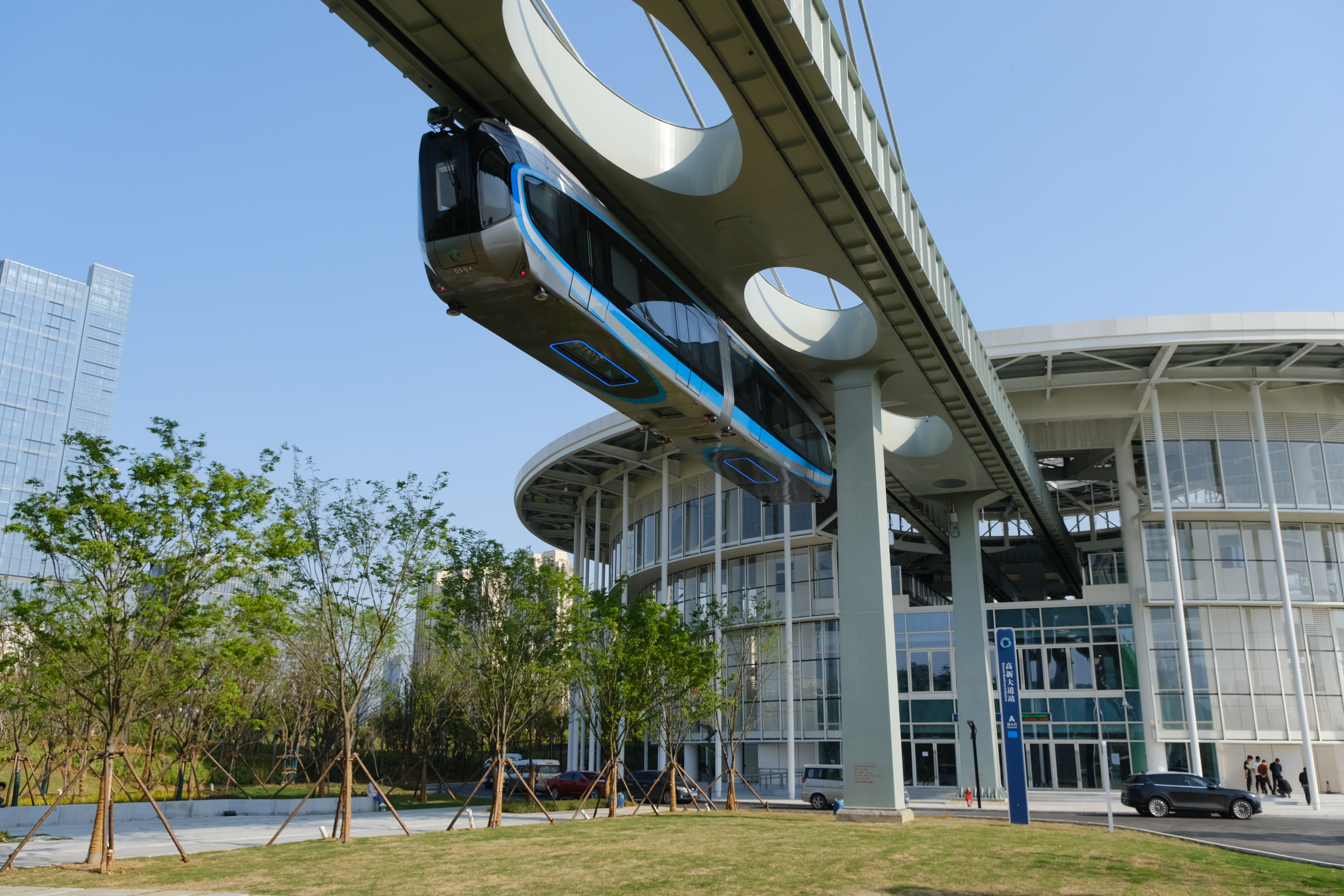
Optics Valley Sky Rail

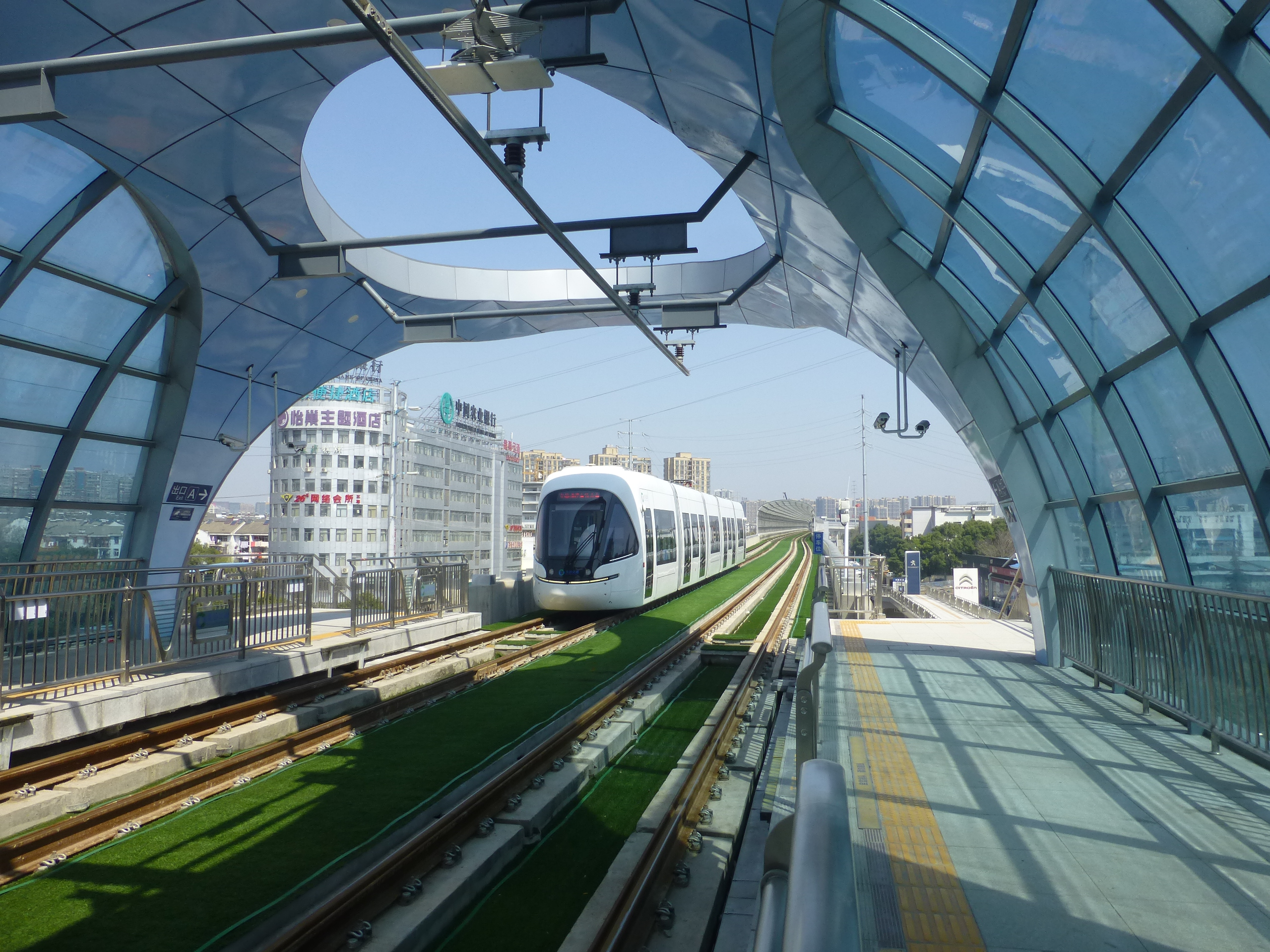
Optics Valley Tramway
