= East Lake Cherry Blossom Park =

Park in Wuhan, China

- Wuhan Moshan Cherry Blossom Park
- 东湖樱花园
- Interactive map of East Lake Cherry Blossom Park
- Type: Botanical garden / Public park
- Location: Wuchang District, Wuhan, Hubei
- Coordinates: 30°32′54″N 114°24′16″E
- Area: 260 acres (110 ha)
- Established: 1978 (Modern park)
- Opened: 1979
- Operator: East Lake Management Office
- Plants: Cherry blossom (Sakura)
- Website: www.whdonghu.com

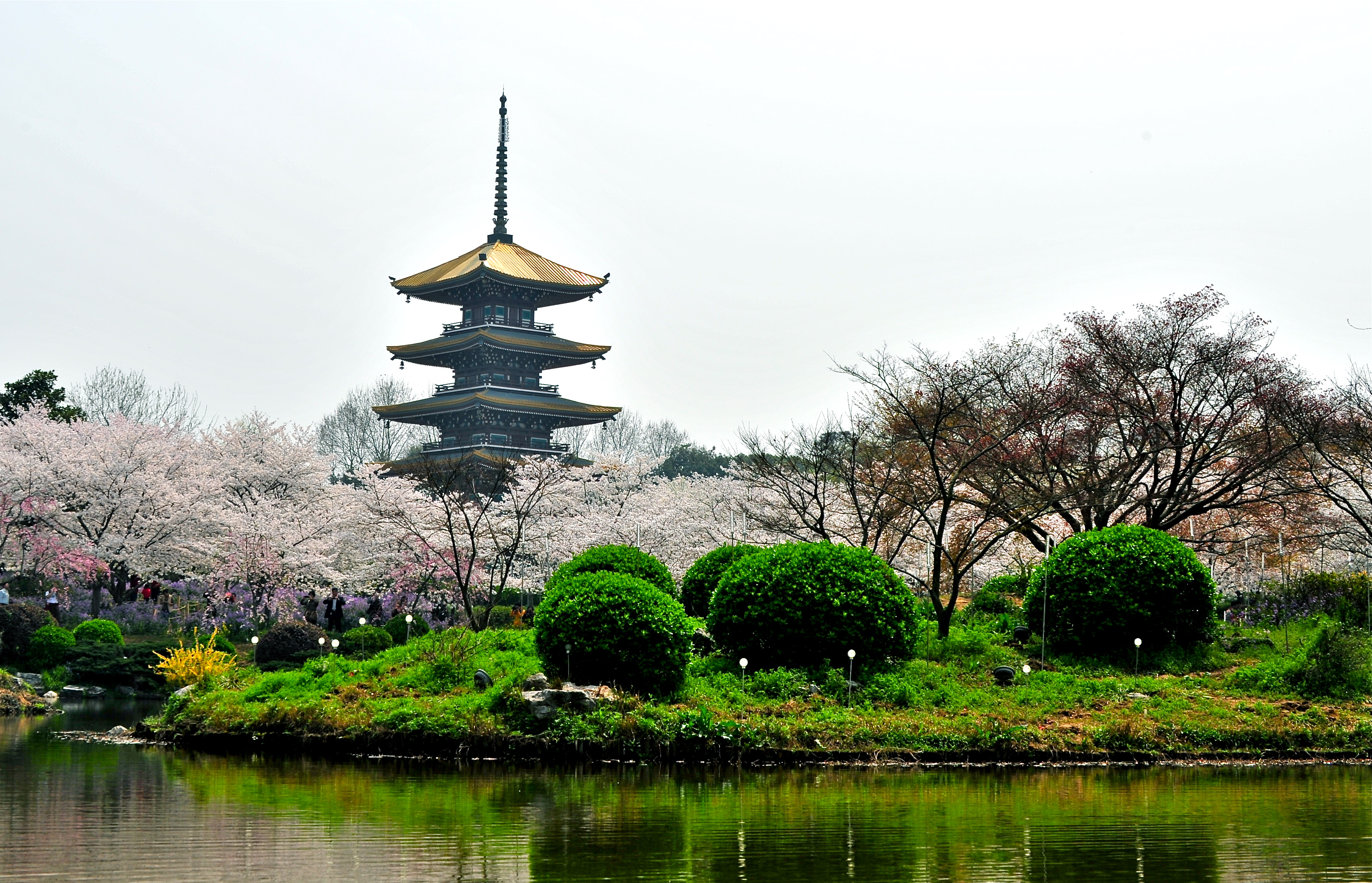
East Lake Cherry Blossom Park

East Lake Cherry Blossom Park (Chinese: 东湖樱花园), also called Wuhan Moshan Cherry Blossom Park (Chinese: 武汉磨山樱园), is a park in the East Lake area of Wuchang District, Wuhan City, Hubei Province, China.

The Japanese cherry trees were planted in this area near Wuhan University during the Japanese Army's occupation of Wuhan, and were continued to be planted after the Second World War.

It is one of the two most famous cherry blossom parks in China, the other being Longwangtang Cherry Blossom Park in Lushunkou District, Dalian, Liaoning.

== See also ==
- East Lake (Wuhan)
