= Peng Shou =

Chinese engineer, business executive, and politician

- Born: August 1960 (age 66); Tongcheng, Anhui, China
- Education: Wuhan University of Technology
- Scientific career
- Fields: Glass
- Workplaces: Bengbu Design & Research Institute for Glass Industry; China Triumph International Engineering Co., Ltd

Chinese name
- Traditional Chinese: 彭壽
- Simplified Chinese: 彭寿
Transcriptions
Standard Mandarin
- Hanyu Pinyin: Péng Shòu

Peng Shou (Chinese: 彭寿; born August 1960) is a Chinese engineer, business executive, and politician. He is the current chairman of the China Triumph International Engineering Co., Ltd (CTIEC) and party chief and president of its Bengbu Design & Research Institute for Glass Industry. He was a delegate to the 17th National Congress of the Chinese Communist Party and the 12th National People's Congress. He is a delegate to the 13th National People's Congress. He is vice-president of the Chinese Ceramic Society (CCS) and the China Building Material Council (CBMF).

== Biography ==
Peng was born in Tongcheng, Anhui, in August 1960. He received his bachelor of engineering degree and master's degree in management from Wuhan University of Technology in 1982 and 2001, respectively. After graduating in 1982, he was assigned to Bengbu Design & Research Institute for Glass Industry, where he was promoted to the head of its Shenzhen Branch in 1991 and to the president position in August 2000.

== Honors and awards ==
- 2010 Guanghua Science and Technology Award
- 2015 Science and Technology Innovation Award of the Ho Leung Ho Lee Foundation
- November 22, 2019 Member of the Chinese Academy of Engineering (CAE)
