= Luonan Subdistrict =

Luonan Subdistrict 珞南街道
- Subdistrict
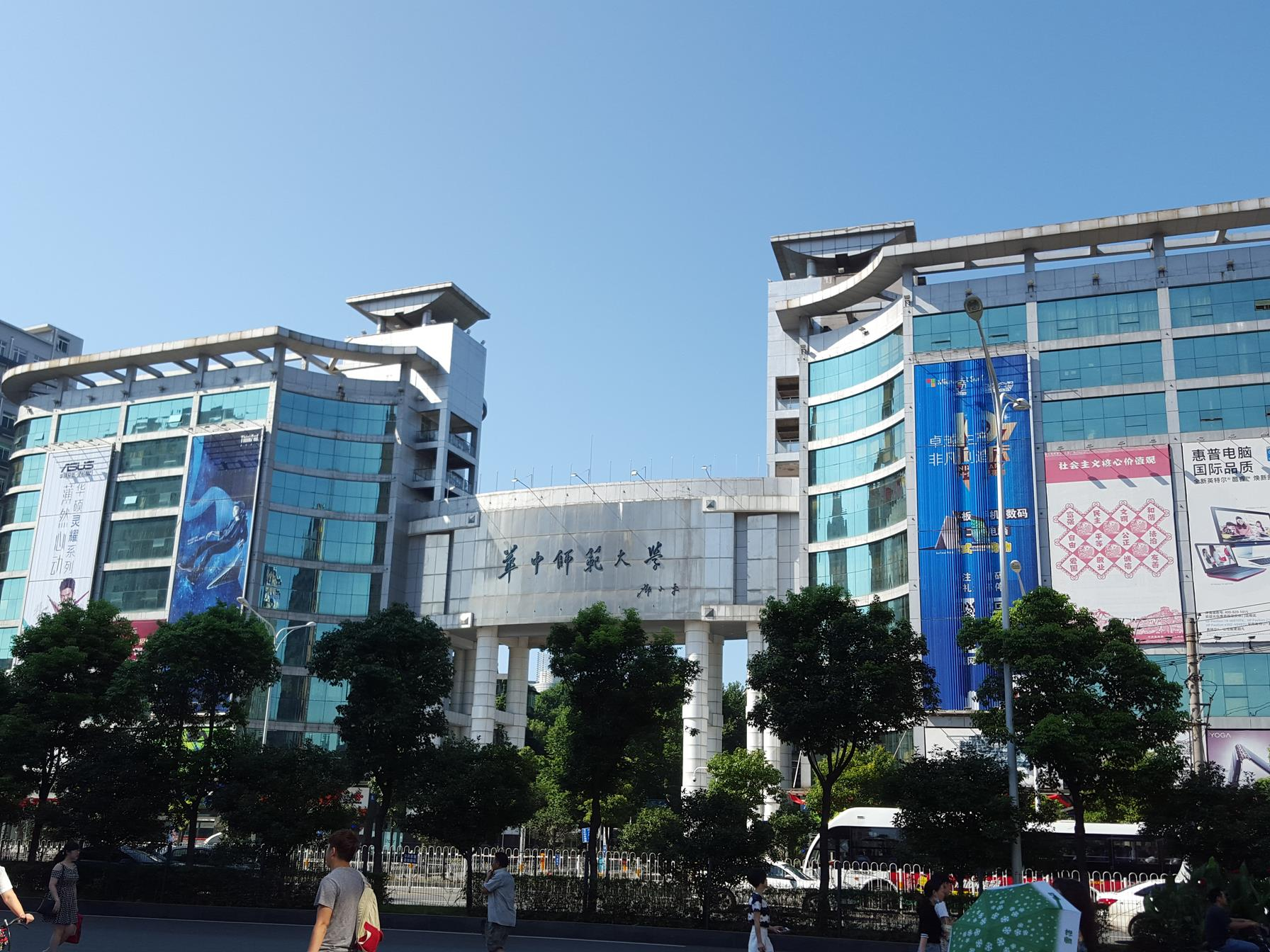
- Central China Normal University

- Location in Hubei
- Coordinates: 30.521°N 114.356°E
- Country: China
- Province: Hubei
- Sub-provincial city: Wuhan
- District: Hongshan
- Established date: September 23, 1986
- Communities: 26

Area
  - Total: 15.3 km^{2} (5.9 sq mi)

Population (2010)
  - Total: 260,701
- Time zone: UTC+8 (China Standard)

Luonan Subdistrict
- Chinese: 珞南街道
- Literal meaning: "Subdistrict South of Luo (reference to Mt. Luòjiā (珞珈山))"
Transcriptions
Standard Mandarin
- Hanyu Pinyin: Luònán Jiēdào

Luonan Subdistrict (Chinese: 珞南街道; pinyin: Luònán Jiēdào) is a subdistrict in Hongshan District, Wuhan, Hubei, China. It includes Central China Normal University and part of Wuhan University of Technology. The area was part of Luojiashan Subdistrict until 1986. The name of the subdistrict means "south of Luo", referring to its position south of Luojiashan Subdistrict and Mt. Luojia (珞珈山).

== History ==
Luonan Subdistrict comprised the southern portion of Luojiashan Subdistrict and its predecessors from 1950 to 1986. Luojiashan Subdistrict shifted between Wuchang District and Hongshan District numerous times during this period.

On July 28, 1986, the 27 communities of Wuchang District's Luojiashan Subdistrict to the south of Bayi Road were transferred to Hongshan District. Luonan Subdistrict was created on September 1 with its headquarters in Wuluocun.

In 1996, the total area of the subdistrict was 13.5 square kilometres (5.2 sq mi).

In December 2009, Fengguang Community and part of Shipailing Community were transferred from Wuchang to Luonan Subdistrict.

In November 2010, it was decided that nine Communities of Luonan Subdistrict (Wuhuan, Fushushan, Tiyuan, Shangwen, Zhuodaoquan, Huquan, Mazhuangyuan, Jinchang and Gaochuang) would form part of the new Zhuodaoquan Subdistrict, which was officially implemented in May 2011, after the 2010 Census.

== Geography ==
There are two stations of Line 2, Wuhan Metro in Luonan Subdistrict: Jiedaokou Station and Guangbutun Station. There are also two stations of the Line 8, Wuhan Metro in Luonan Subdistrict: Jiedaokou Station and Mafangshan Station.

=== Administrative Divisions ===
Luonan Subdistrict is made up of 26 communities.

Name	Chinese (S)	Hanyu Pinyin
Shipaiyuan Community	石牌园社区	Shípáiyuán Shèqū
Hongluo Community	洪珞社区	Hóngluò Shèqū
Jiedaokou Community	街道口社区	Jiēdàokǒu Shèqū
Wuluo Community	武珞社区	Wǔluò Shèqū
Quanyechang Community	劝业场社区	
Wuhan University of Technology East Campus Community	武汉理工大东社区	Wǔhànlǐgōngdōng Shèqū
Wuhan University of Technology West Campus Community	武汉理工大西社区	Wǔhànlǐgōngxī Shèqū
Siyanjing Community	四眼井社区	Sìyǎnjǐng Shèqū
Guangbutun Community	广埠屯社区	Guǎngbùtún Shèqū
Wuce Community	武测社区	Wǔcè Shèqū
Guangbalu Community	广八路社区	Guǎngbālù Shèqū
Qi'er'er (722) Community	七二二社区	Qī'èr'èr Shèqū
Lidao Community	丽岛社区	
Jinqiao Community	金桥社区	Jīnqiáo Shèqū
Fangguiyuan Community	方桂园社区	Fāngguìyuán Shèqū
Yuanbaolin Community	元宝林社区	Yuánbǎolín Shèqū
Liming Community	黎明社区	Límíng Shèqū
Youli Community	尤李社区	Yóulǐ Shèqū
Boyuan Community	博苑社区	
Zhongjiansanju Community	中建三局社区	Zhōngjiànsānjú Shèqū
Yuanmengjiayuan Community	圆梦家园社区	Yuánmèngjiāyuán Shèqū
Luogui Community	珞桂社区	Luòguì Shèqū
Yinhaiyayuan Community	银海雅苑社区	Yínhǎiyǎyuàn Shèqū
Shichengmingju Community	狮城名居社区	Shīchéngmíngjū Shèqū
Central China Normal University Community	华中师范大学社区	Huázhōngshīfàndàxué Shèqū
Fengguangyuan Community	风光苑社区	Fèngguāngyuàn Shèqū
