= Jiedaokou station =

Wuhan Metro station

Jiedaokou 街道口 metro
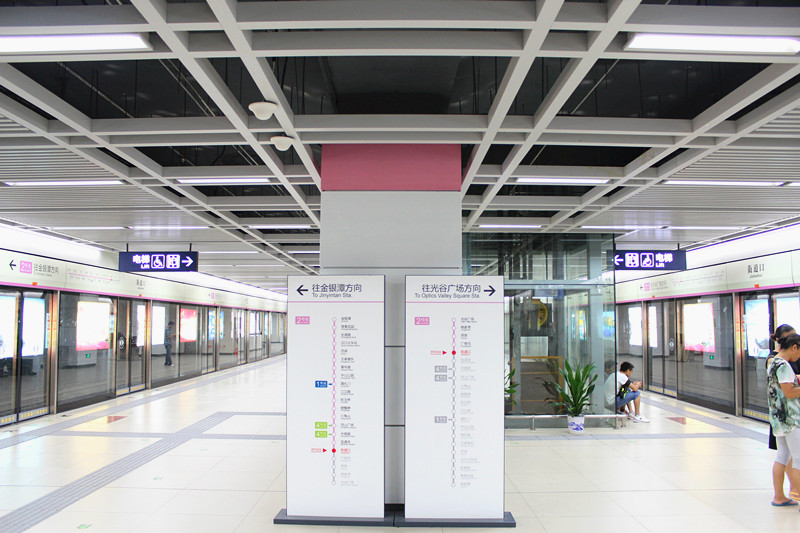
- Line 2 platform

General information
- Location: Jiedaokou Community, Luonan Subdistrict, Hongshan District, Wuhan, Hubei; China
- Coordinates: 30°31′45″N 114°20′52″E
- Operated by: Wuhan Metro Co., Ltd
- Lines: Line 2; Line 8
- Platforms: 4 (2 island platforms)

Construction
- Structure type: Underground

History
- Opened: December 28, 2012 (Line 2); January 2, 2021 (Line 8)

Services
Preceding station	Wuhan Metro	Following station
Baotong Temple towards Tianhe International Airport	Line 2	Guangbutun towards Fozuling
Xiaohongshan towards Jintan Road	Line 8	Mafangshan towards Military Athletes' Village
Location

Jiedaokou Station (Chinese: 街道口站) is a station of Line 2 and Line 8 of Wuhan Metro. It entered revenue service on December 28, 2012. It is located in Hongshan District.

== Station layout ==
G	Entrances and Exits	Exits A-D
B1	Concourse	Faregates, Station Agent
B2	Northbound	← Line 2 towards Tianhe International Airport (Baotong Temple)
B2	Island platform, doors will open on the left
B2	Southbound	Line 2 towards Fozuling (Guangbutun) →

== Gallery ==
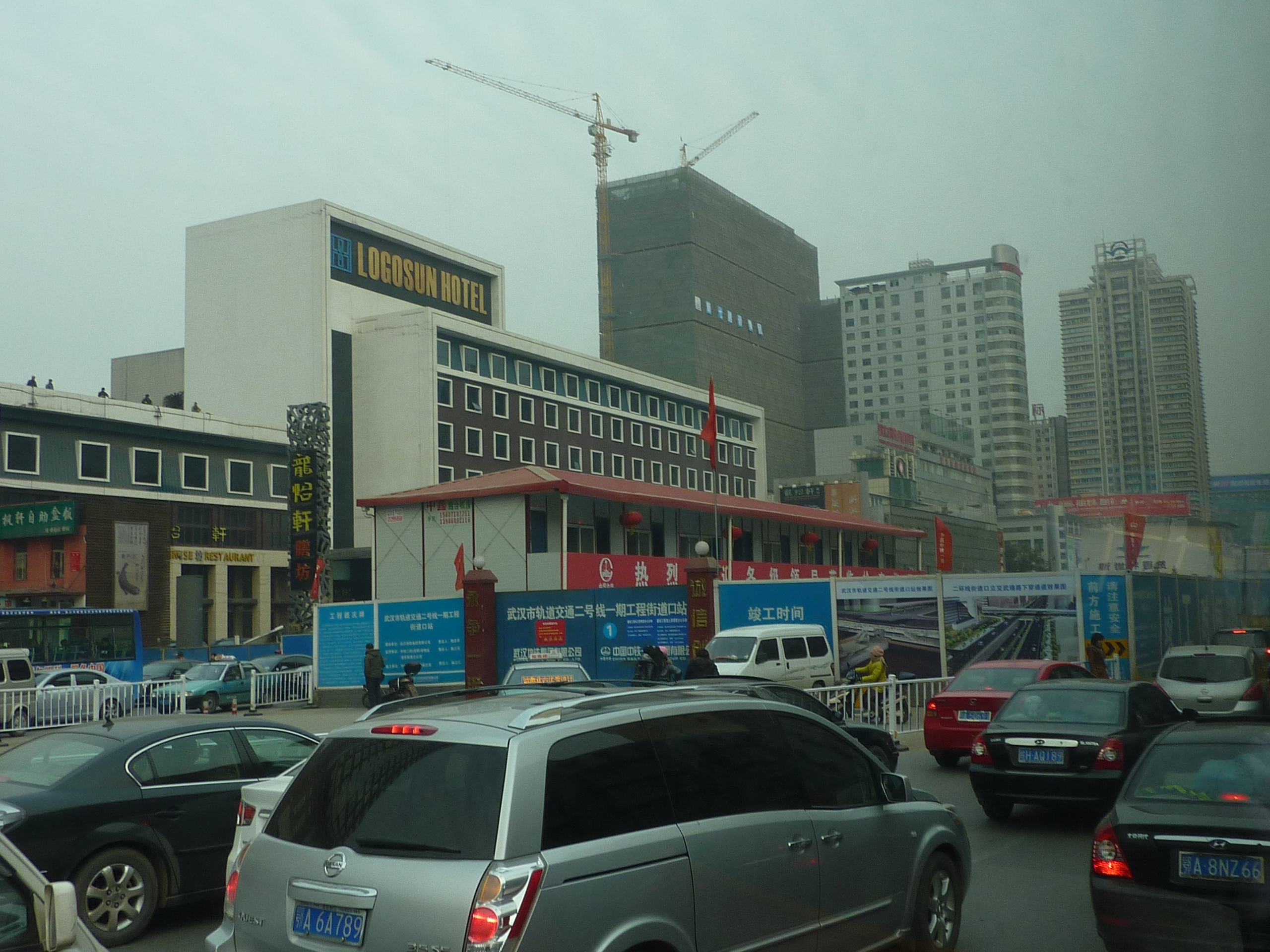
Station under construction in 2011

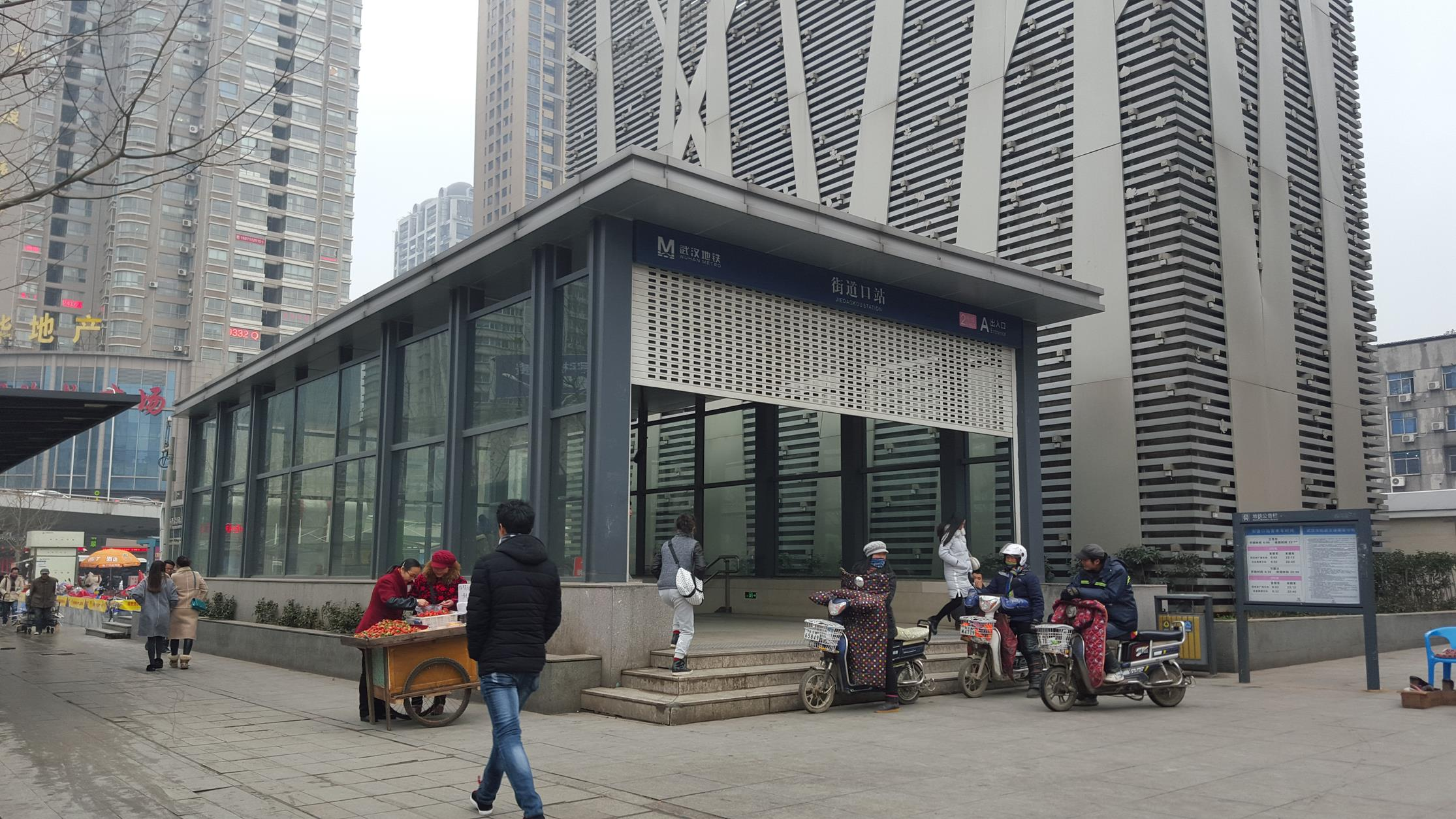
Entrance A

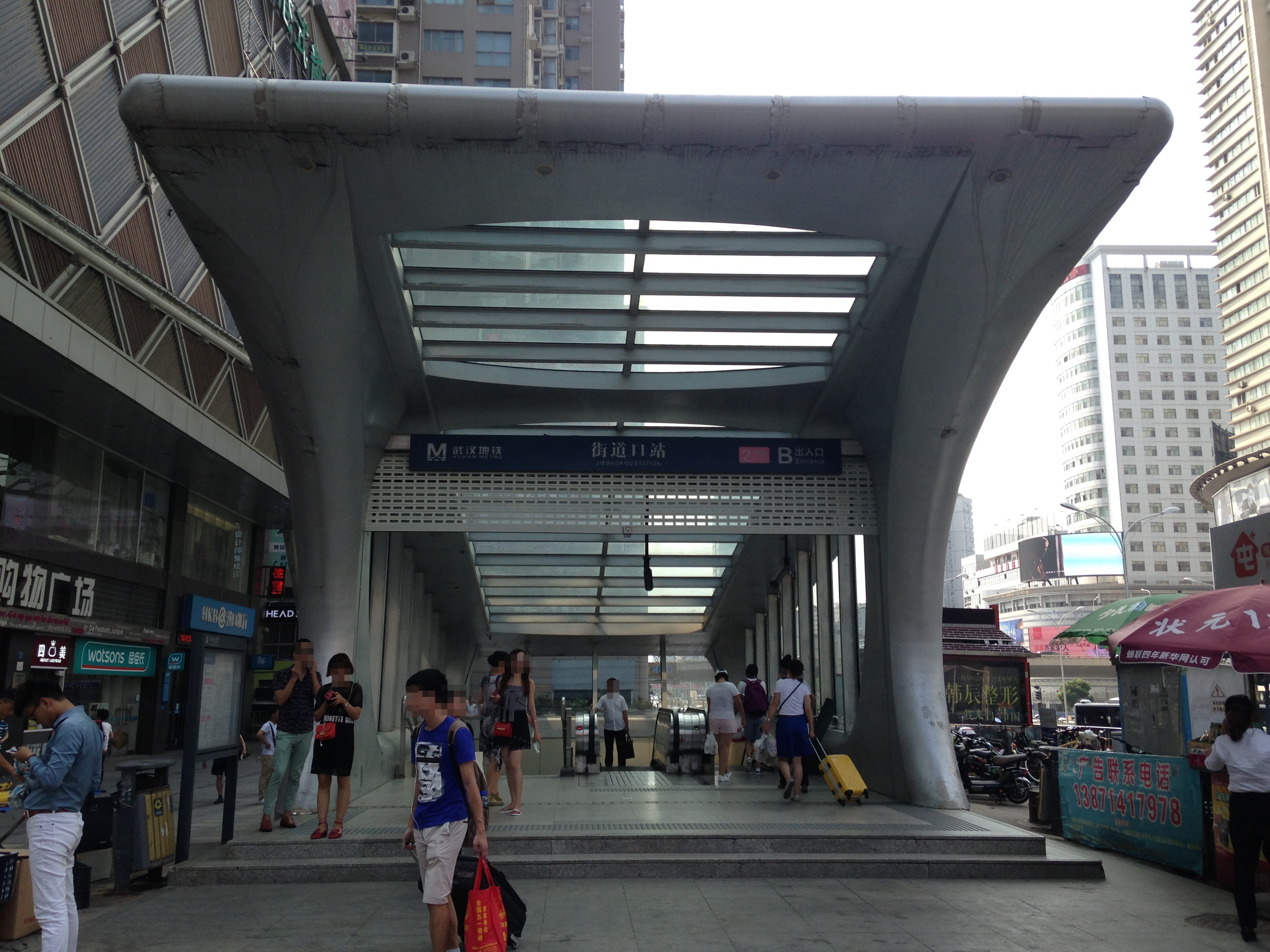
Entrance B

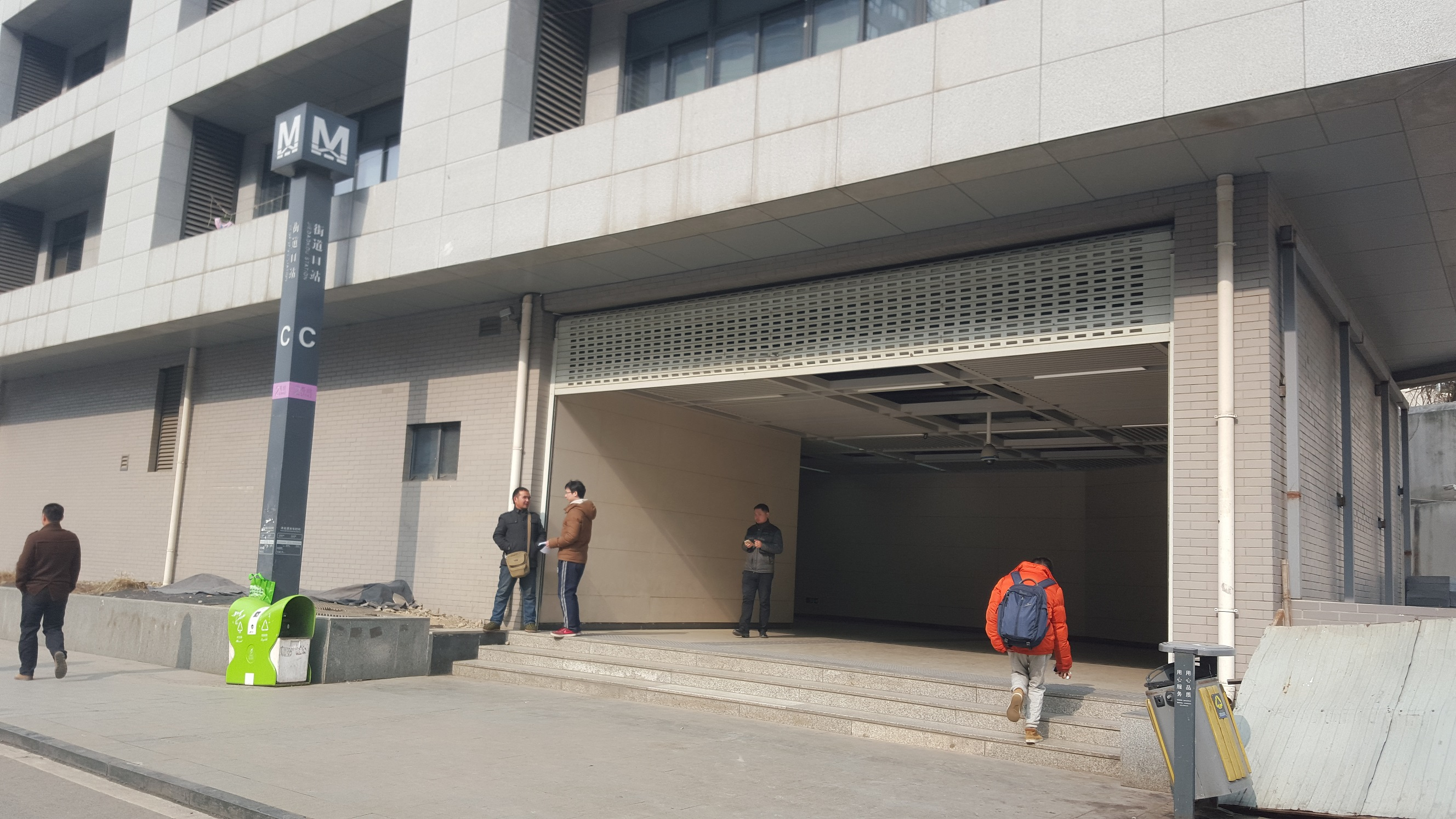
Entrance C

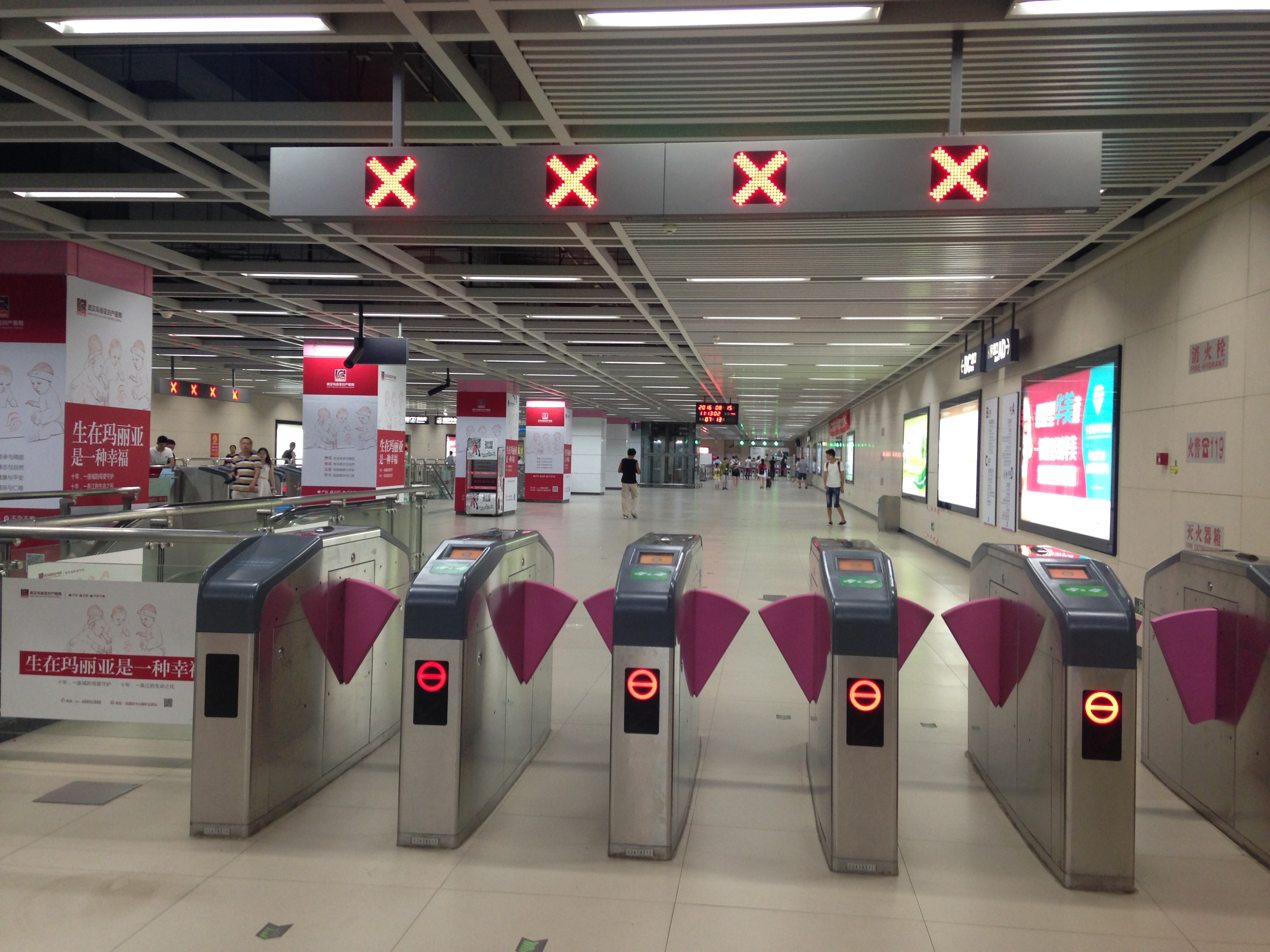
Concourse

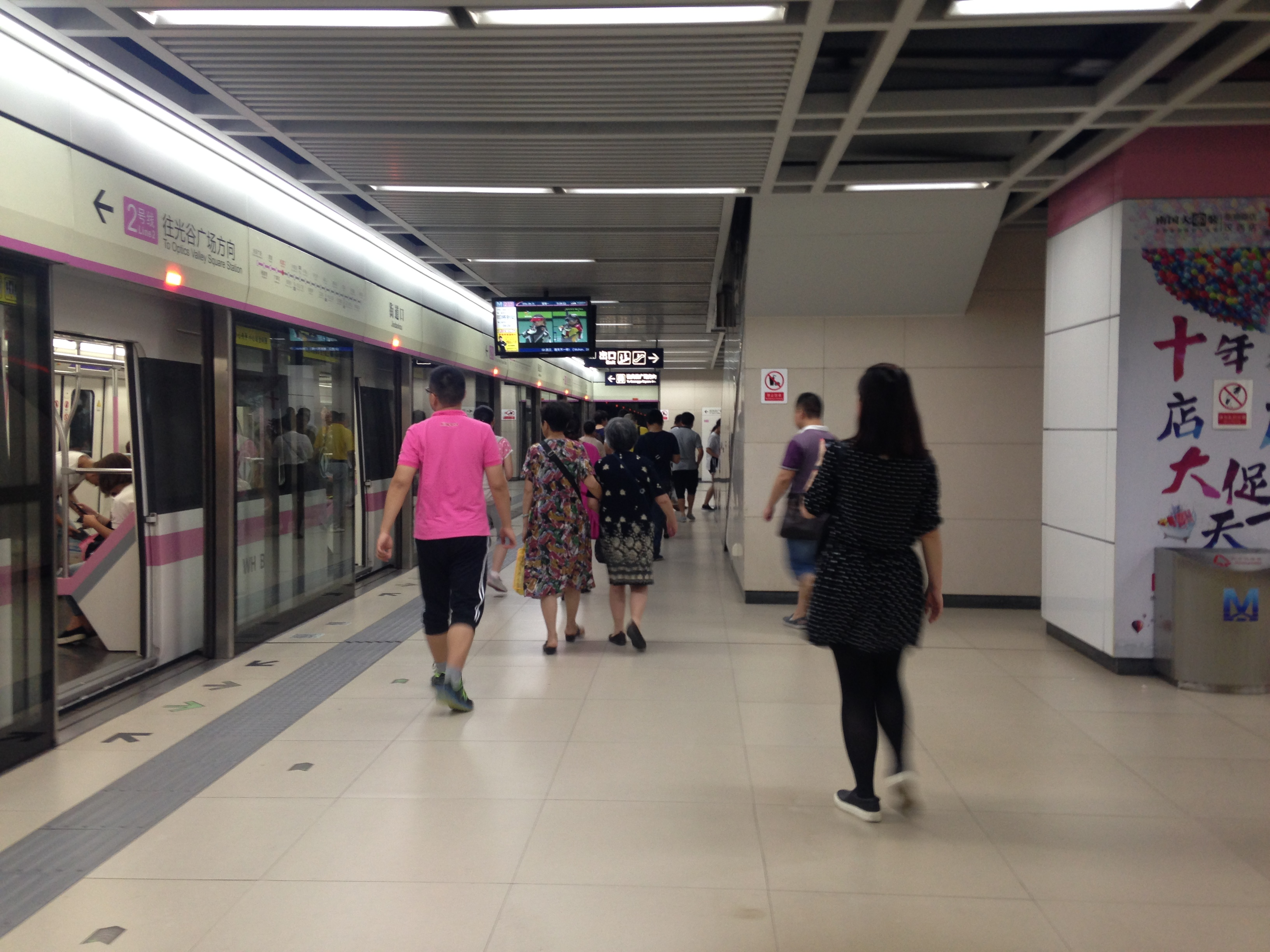
Line 2 platform

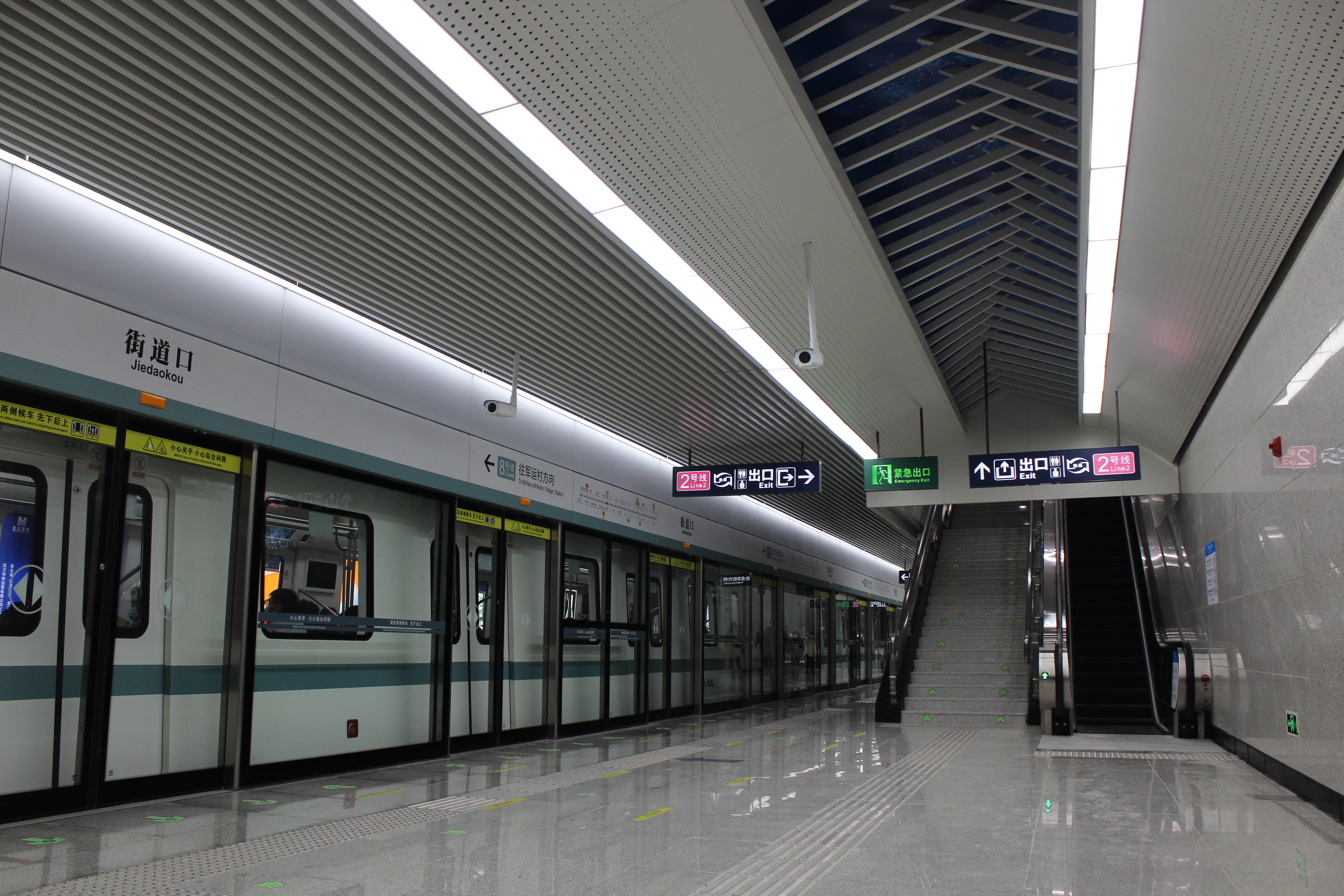
Line 8 platform
