= Baotong Temple station =

Wuhan Metro station

Baotong Temple 宝通寺
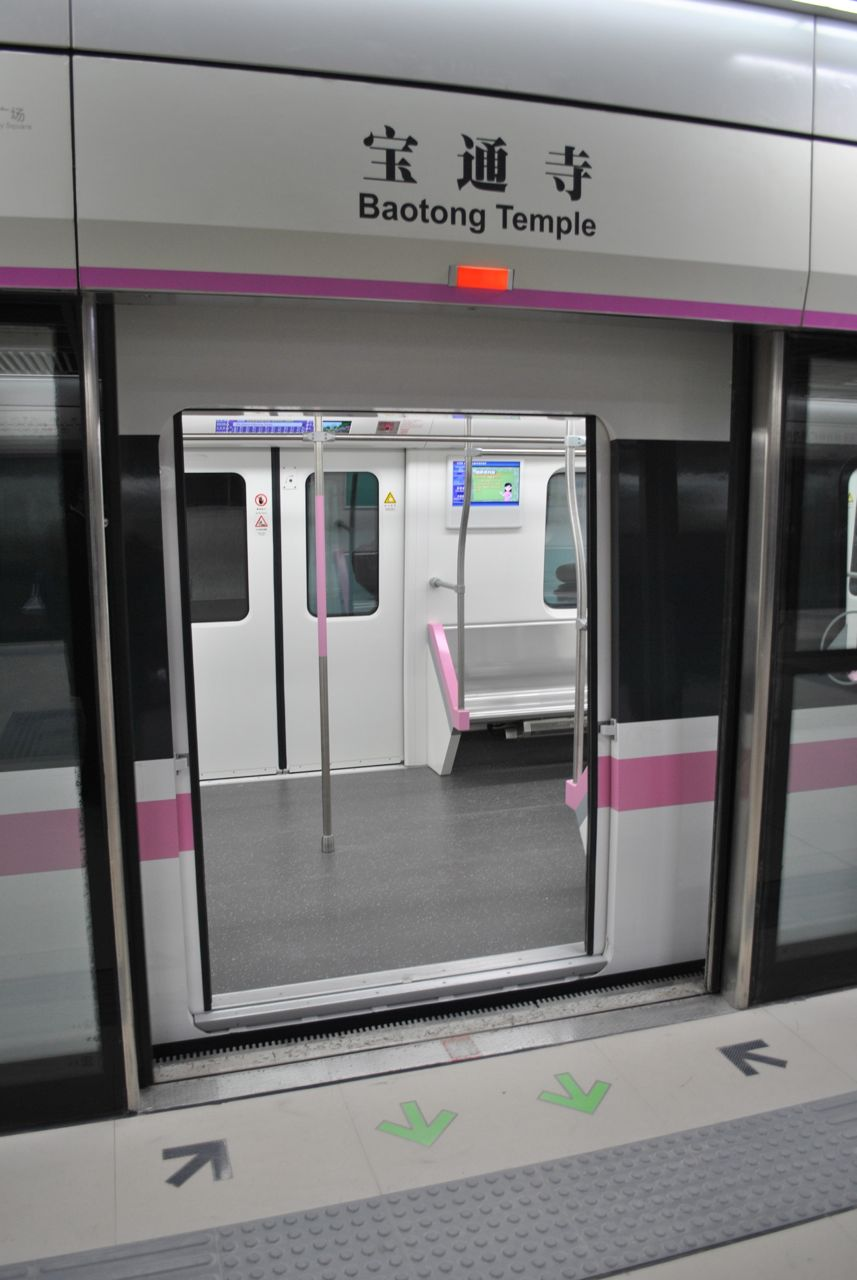

General information
- Location: Hongshan District, Wuhan, Hubei; China
- Coordinates: 30°31′57″N 114°20′07″E
- Operated by: Wuhan Metro Co., Ltd
- Line: Line 2
- Platforms: 2 (1 island platform)

Construction
- Structure type: Underground

History
- Opened: December 28, 2012 (Line 2)

Services
Preceding station	Wuhan Metro	Following station
Zhongnan Road towards Tianhe International Airport	Line 2	Jiedaokou towards Fozuling
Location

Baotong Temple Station (Chinese: 宝通寺站) is a station of Line 2 of Wuhan Metro. It entered revenue service on December 28, 2012. It is located in Hongshan District. Baotong Temple is located to the immediate north of the station.

== Station layout ==
G	Entrances and Exits	Exits A-D
B1	Concourse	Faregates, Station Agent
B2	Northbound	← Line 2 towards Tianhe International Airport (Zhongnan Road)
B2	Island platform, doors will open on the left
B2	Southbound	Line 2 towards Fozuling (Jiedaokou) →

== Gallery ==
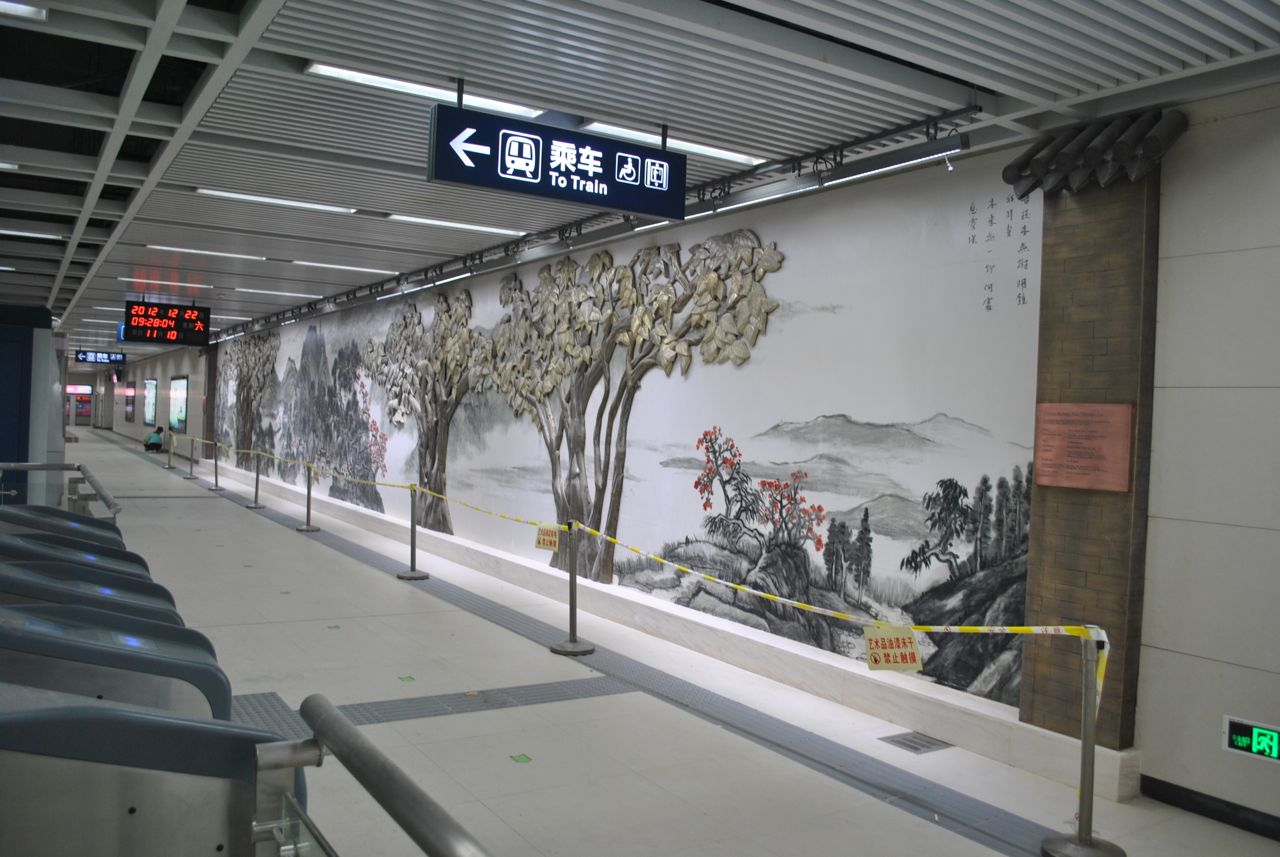
Wall

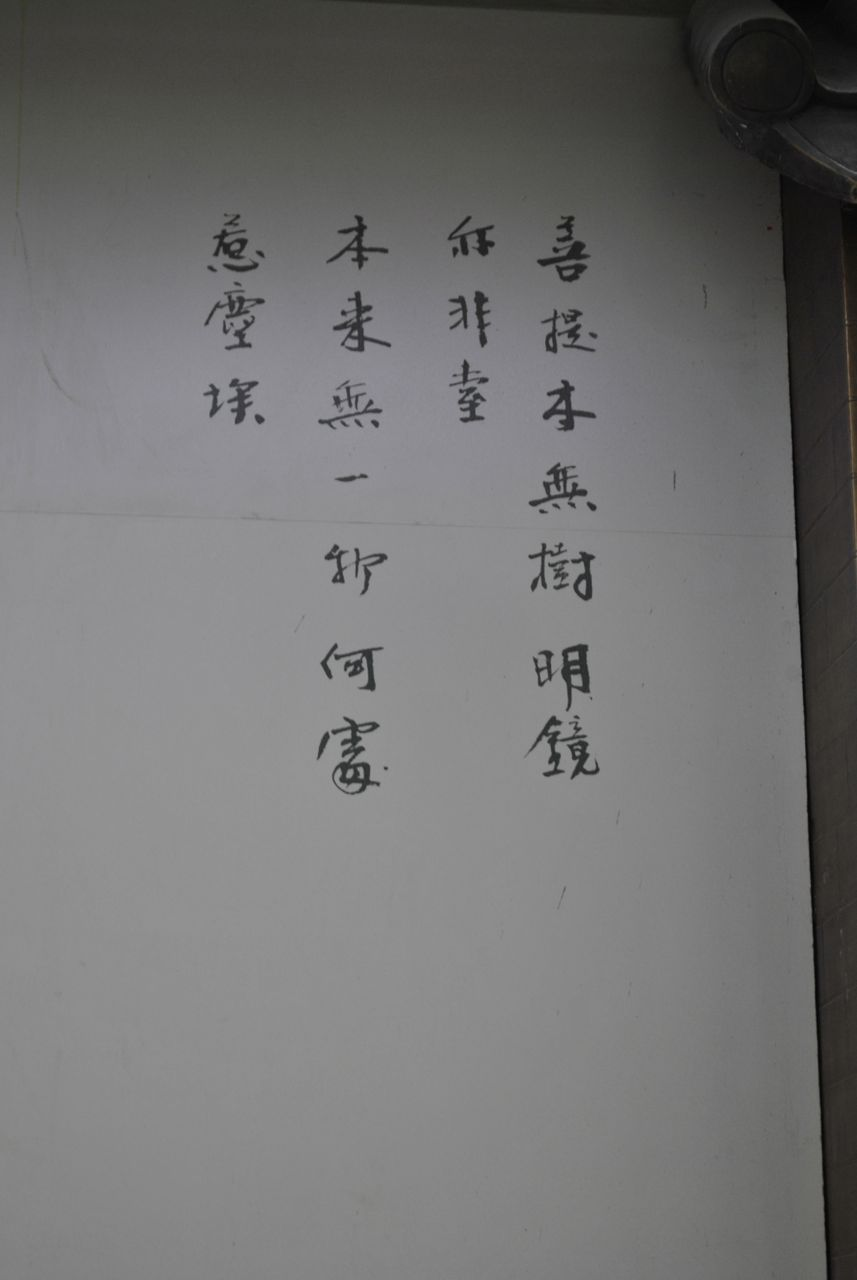

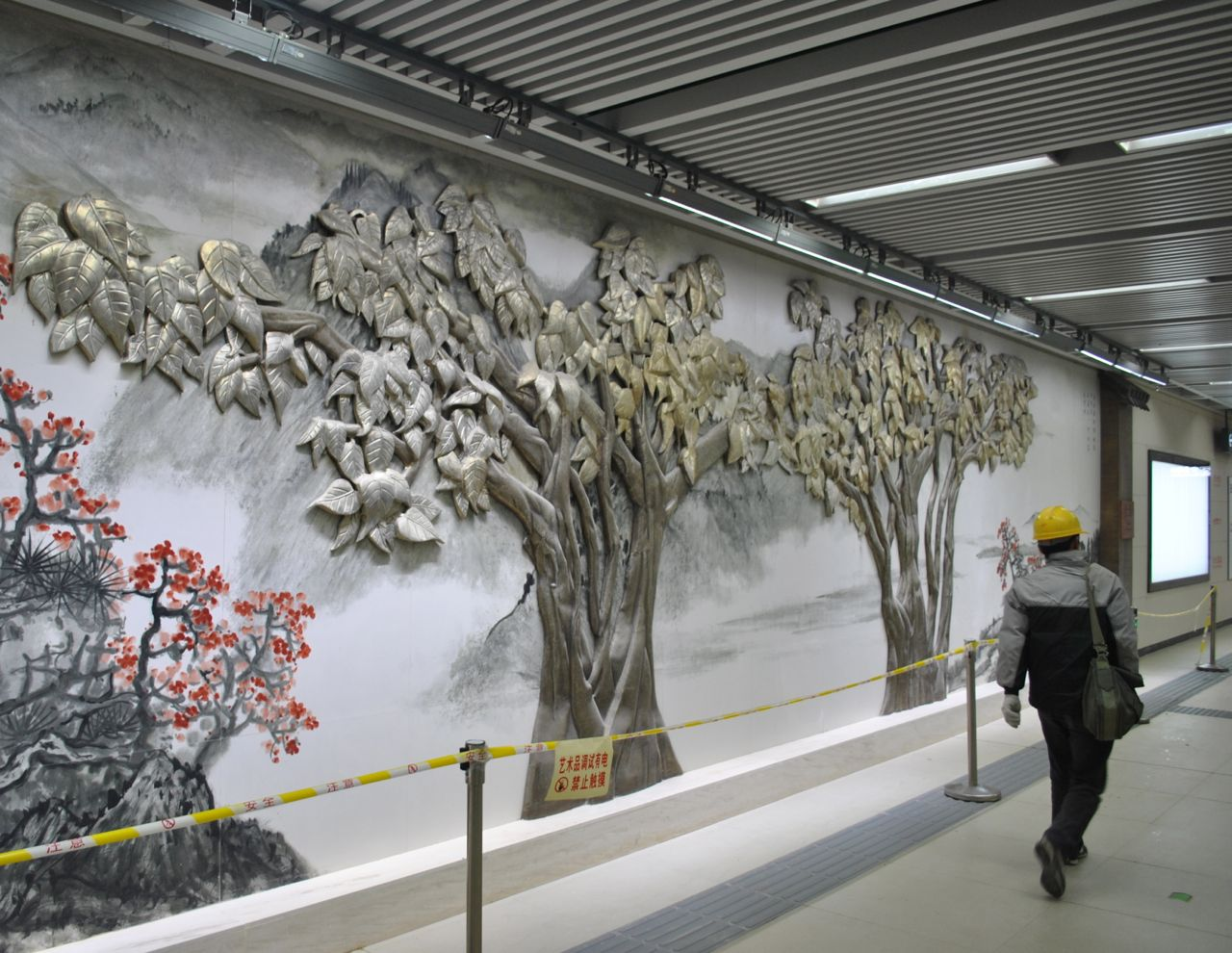

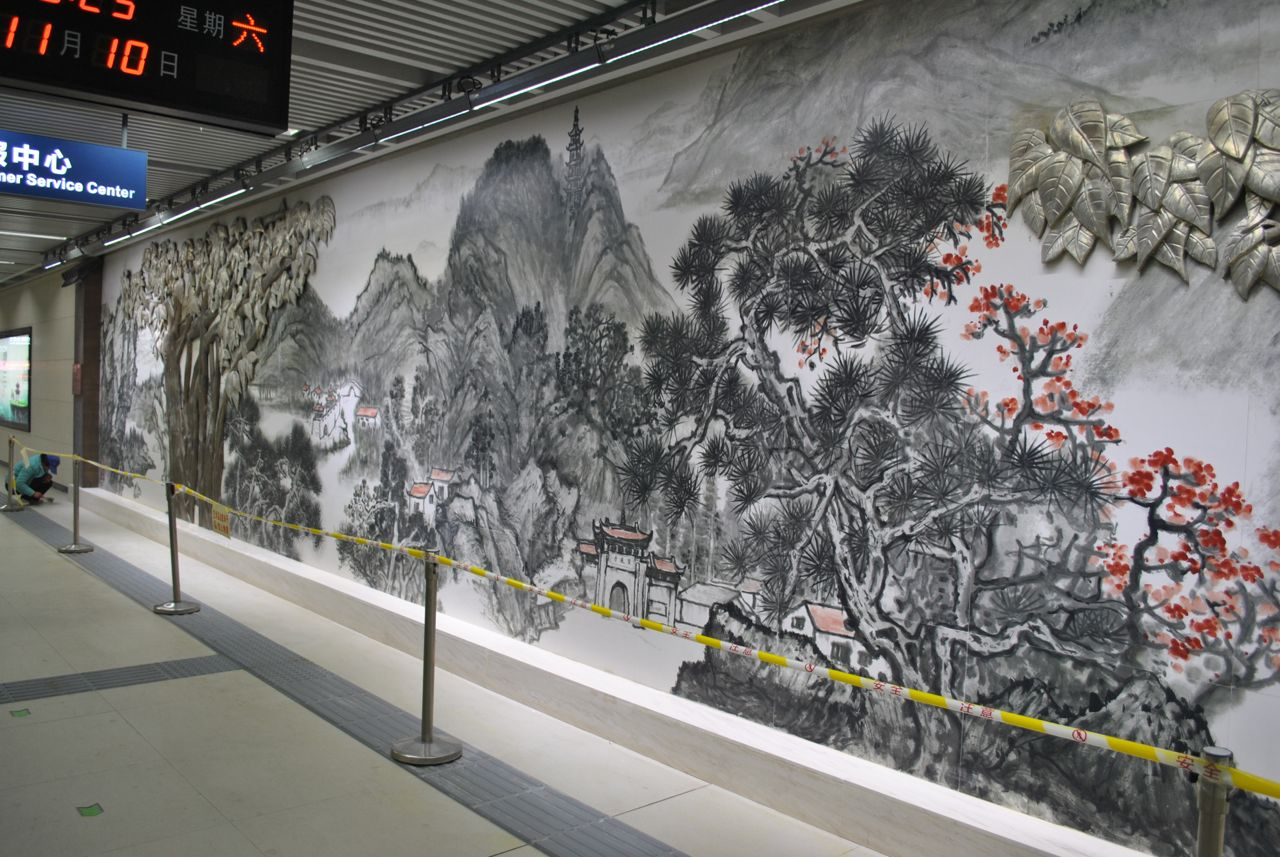

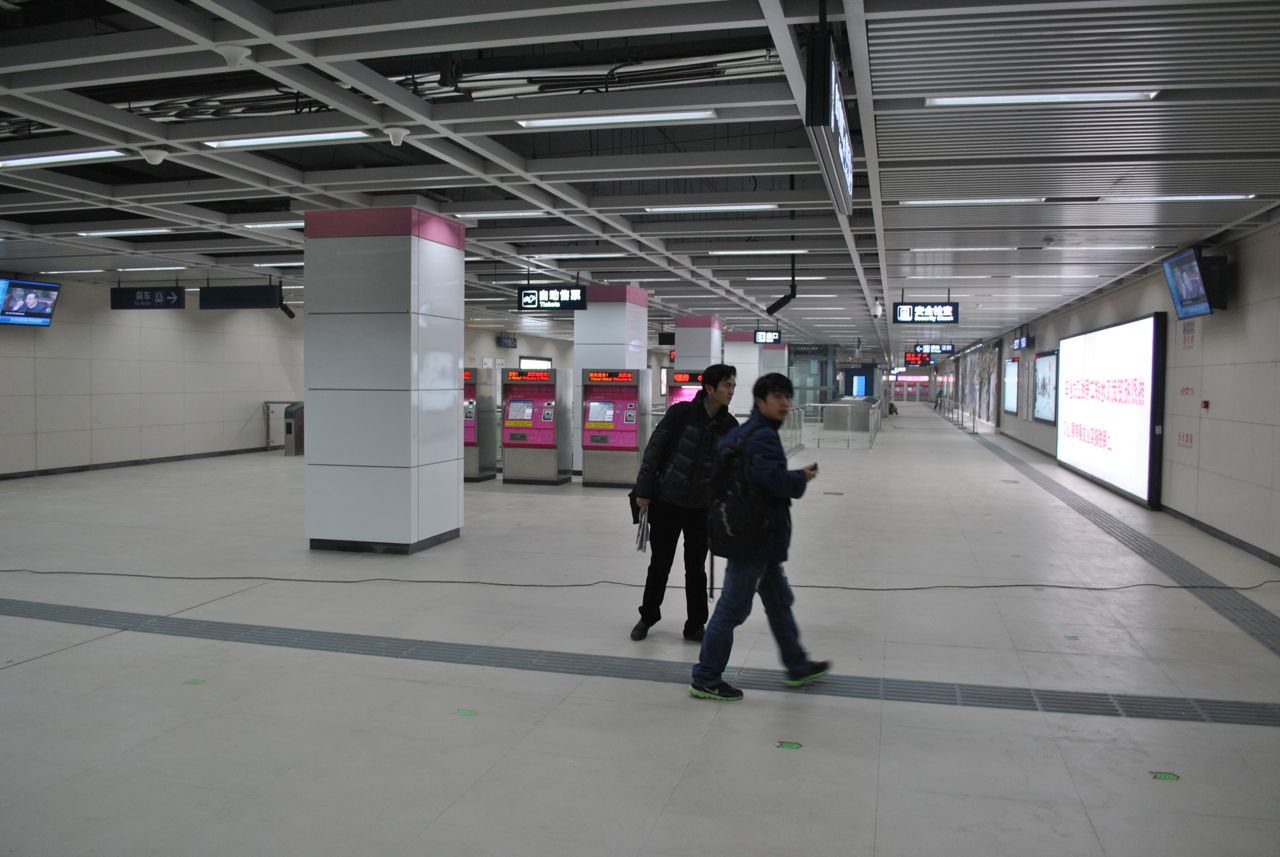
Station hall

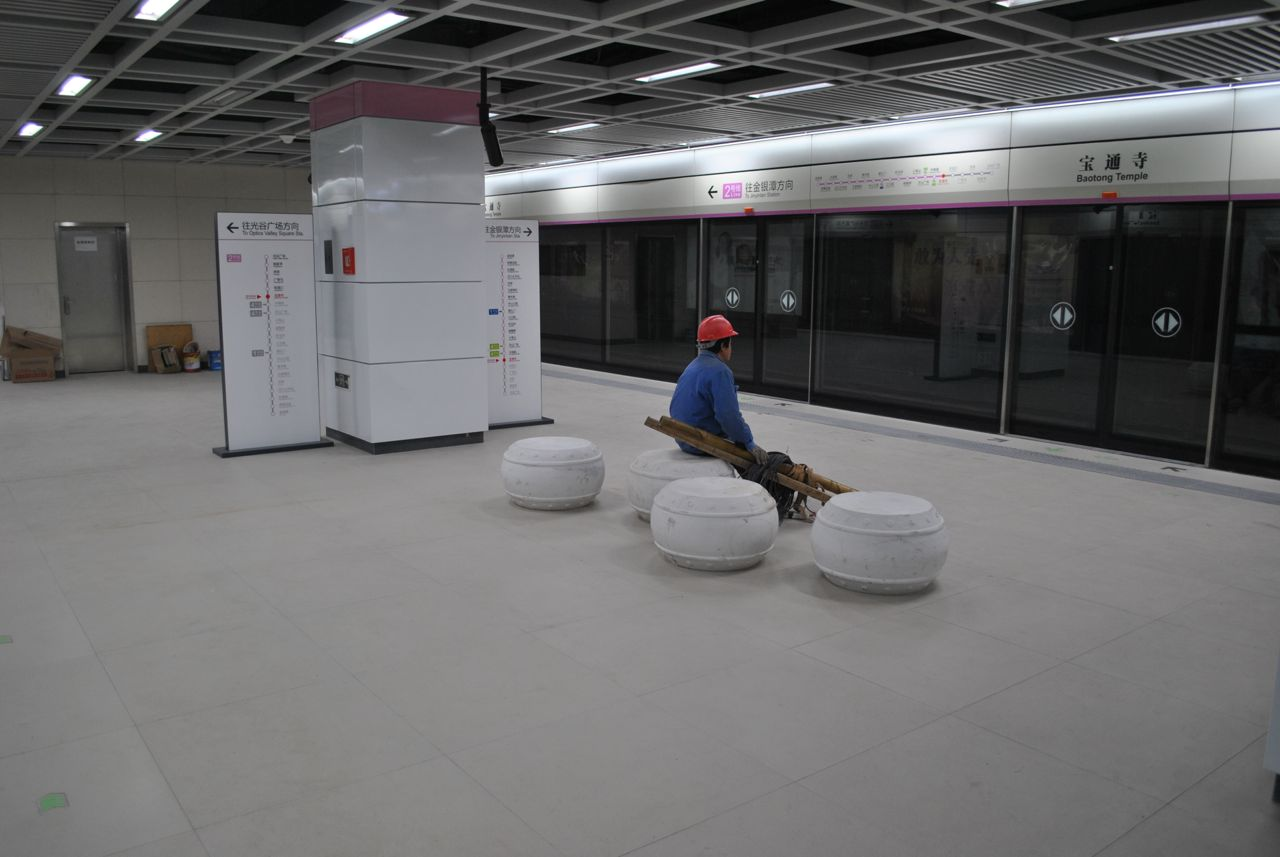
Platform

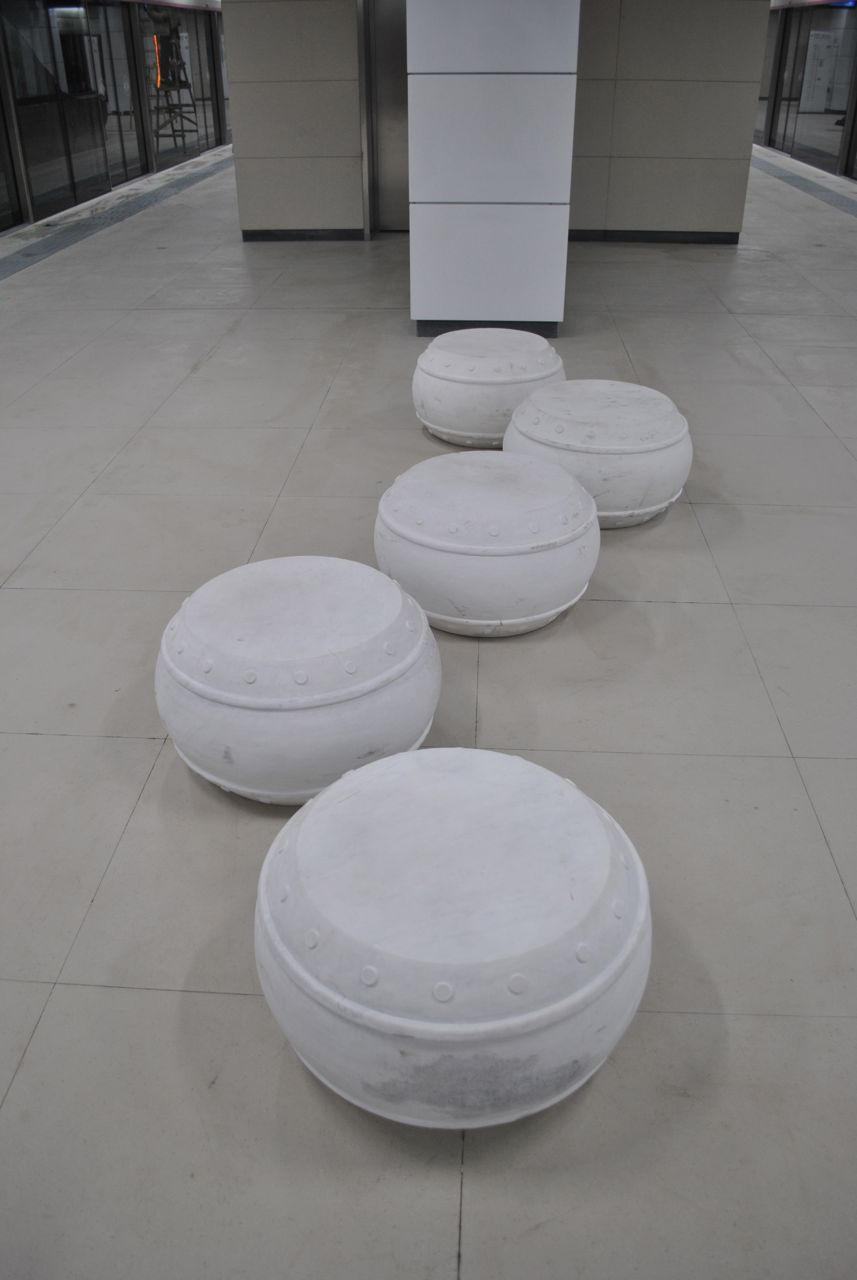
Desk

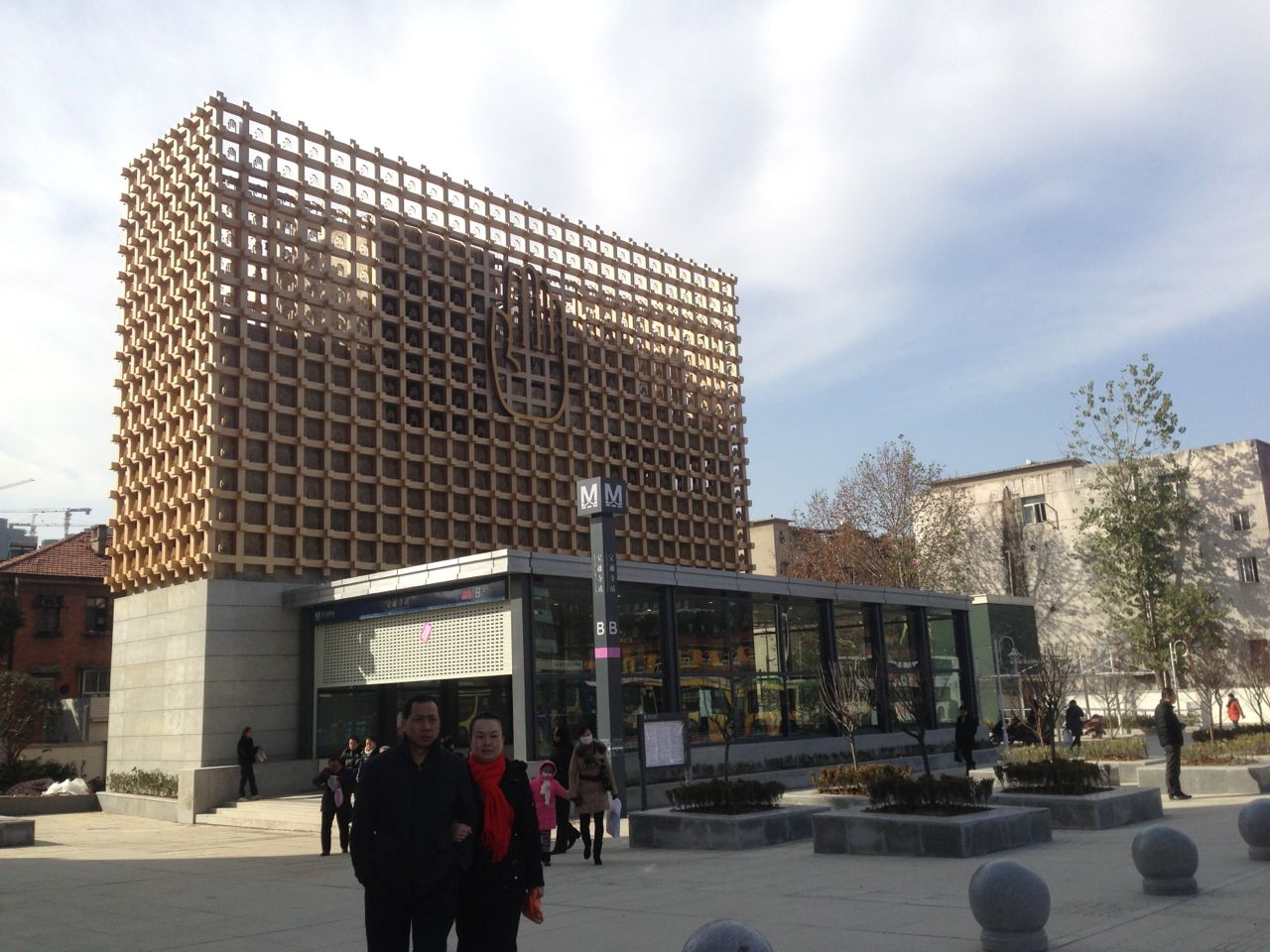
Exit B
