= Guangbutun station =

Wuhan Metro station

Guangbutun 广埠屯 metro
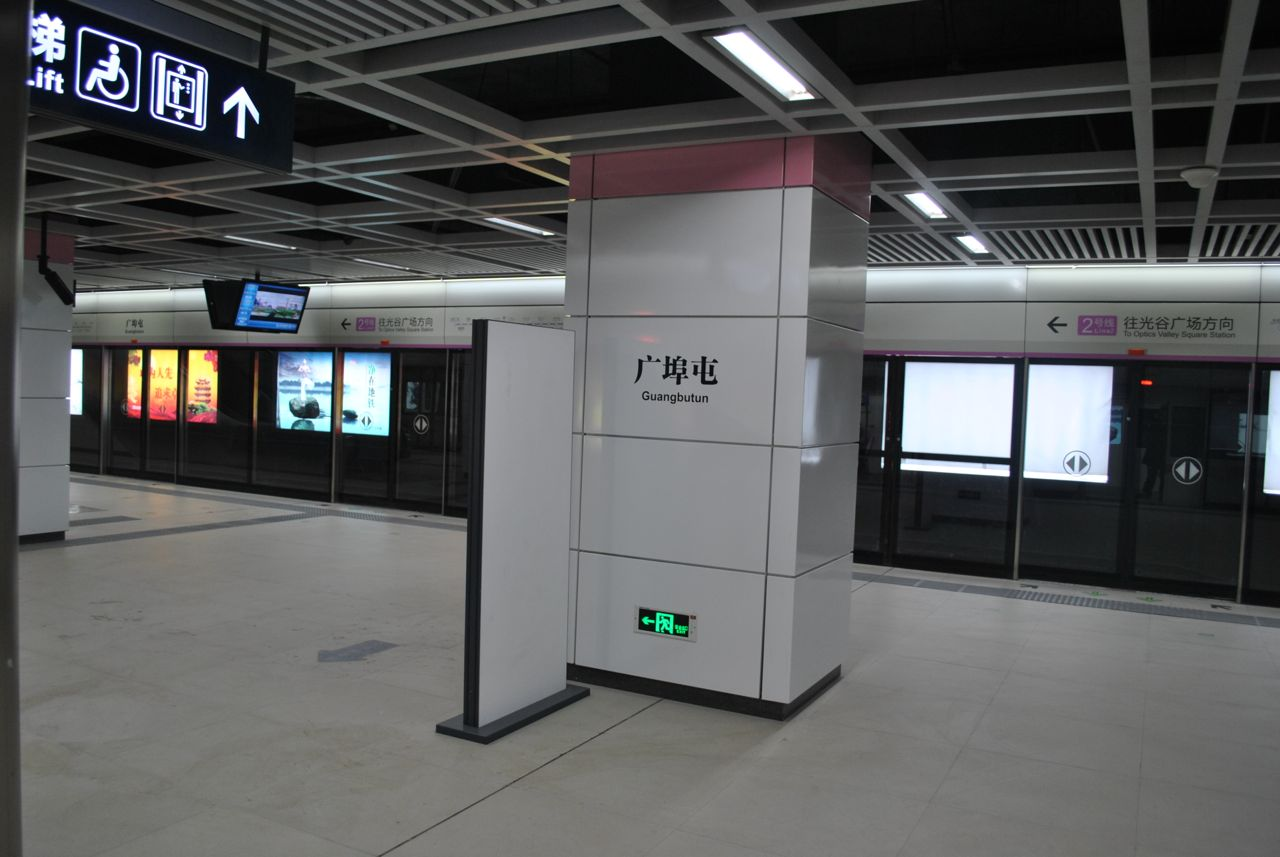

General information
- Location: Guangbutun Community, Luonan Subdistrict, Hongshan District, Wuhan, Hubei; China
- Coordinates: 30°31′28″N 114°21′32″E
- Operated by: Wuhan Metro Co., Ltd
- Line: Line 2
- Platforms: 2 (1 island platform)

Construction
- Structure type: Underground

History
- Opened: December 28, 2012 (Line 2)

Services
Preceding station	Wuhan Metro	Following station
Jiedaokou towards Tianhe International Airport	Line 2	Huquan towards Fozuling
Location

Guangbutun Station (Chinese: 广埠屯站) is a station of Line 2 of Wuhan Metro. It entered revenue service on December 28, 2012. It is located in Hongshan District.

== Station layout ==
G	Entrances and Exits	Exits A-D, H, J, K
B1	Concourse	Faregates, Station Agent
B2	Northbound	← Line 2 towards Tianhe International Airport (Jiedaokou)
B2	Island platform, doors will open on the left
B2	Southbound	Line 2 towards Fozuling (Huquan) →

== Gallery ==
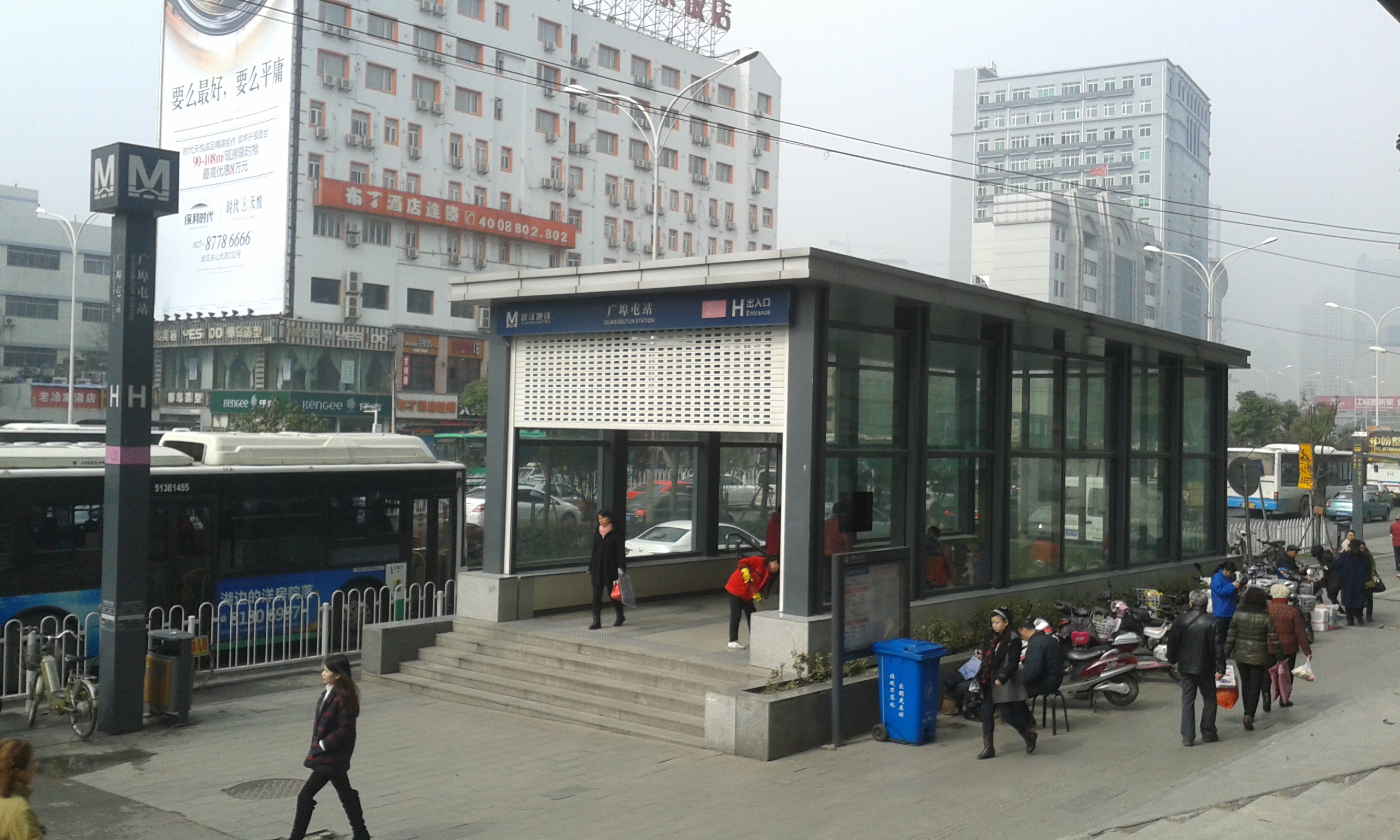
Entrance H

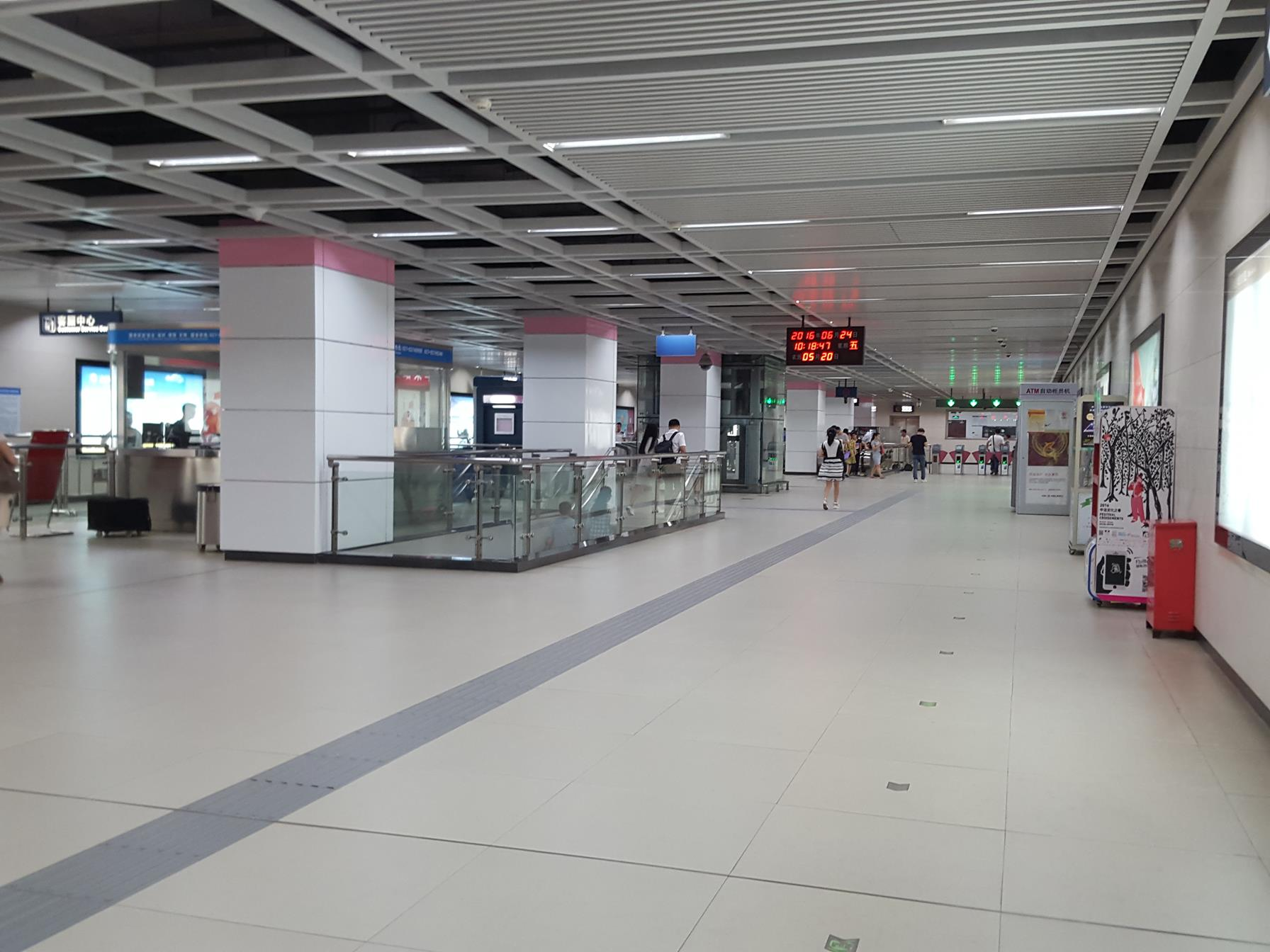
Concourse

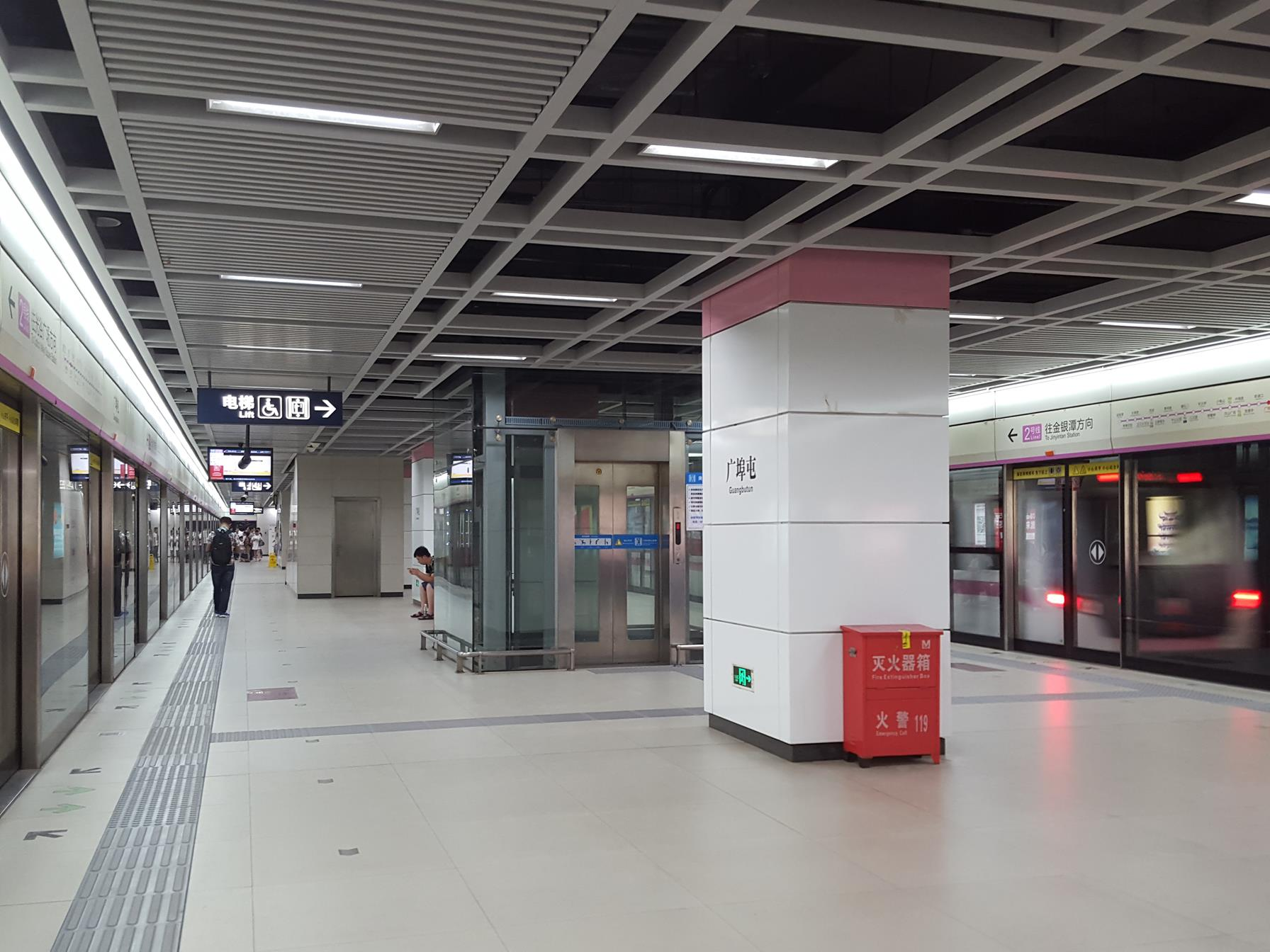
Platform
