= Chinese Ceramic Society =

Chinese professional body and learned society

- Abbreviation: CCS
- Founded: 1945
- Type: Professional organization
- Purpose: Ceramic
- Location: Beijing, China
- Region served: China
- Members: 20,000+
- Key people: Gao Ruiping
- Parent organization: China Association for Science and Technology
- Website: www.ceramsoc.com

The Chinese Ceramic Society (simplified Chinese: 中国硅酸盐学会; traditional Chinese: 中國硅酸鹽學會; pinyin: Zhōngguó Guīsuānyán Xuéhuì; abbreviated CCS) of Beijing is a Chinese non-profit professional body and learned society in the field of Chinese ceramics with a focus on scientific research, emerging technologies, and applications in which ceramic materials are an element.

== History ==
The Chinese Ceramic Society started in 1945 as a research group in southwest China's Chongqing city. In January 1951 this group became the "China Kiln Engineering Society" (中国窑业工程学会), but was closed down in October. In December 1956, the "Preparatory Committee of China Silicates Society" (中国矽酸盐学会筹委会) was founded in Beijing, and in November 1959 the name was changed to the "Chinese Ceramic Society". As of 2018, the society has 21 specialized committees and 3 working committees with more than 20,000 individual members.

== Scientific publishing ==
- Journal of Materiomics
