= Wuhan University of Technology =

Public university in Wuhan, Hubei, China

Coordinates: 30.5986°N 114.3424°E

- 武汉理工大学
- Motto: 厚德博学，追求卓越
- Motto in English: Sound in Morality, Broad in Learning and Pursuing Excellence
- Type: Public
- Established: 1898; 128 years ago (Hubei Institution of Technology); 1958; 68 years ago (Wuhan University of Technology); 1945; 81 years ago (Wuhan Transportation University); 1958; 68 years ago (Wuhan Automotive Polytechnic University)
- President: Zongkai Yang
- Faculty: 5,570
- Undergraduates: 36,000
- Postgraduates: 16,000
- Location: Wuhan, Hubei, China
- Website: whut.edu.cn

Wuhan University of Technology
- Simplified Chinese: 武汉理工大学
- Traditional Chinese: 武漢理工大學
Transcriptions
Standard Mandarin
- Hanyu Pinyin: Wǔhàn Lǐgōng Dàxué

Abbreviation
- Chinese: 武理工
Transcriptions
Standard Mandarin
- Hanyu Pinyin: Wǔlǐgōng

The Wuhan University of Technology (WHUT; 武汉理工大学) is a public research university in Wuhan, Hubei, China. It is affiliated with the Ministry of Education. The university is part of the Double First-Class Construction and Project 211.

The university emerged as a result of the merger of three universities in 2000: Wuhan Industrial University (武汉工业大学), Wuhan Transportation Technology University (武汉交通科技大学), and Wuhan Automotive Industrial University (武汉汽车工业大学).

== History ==
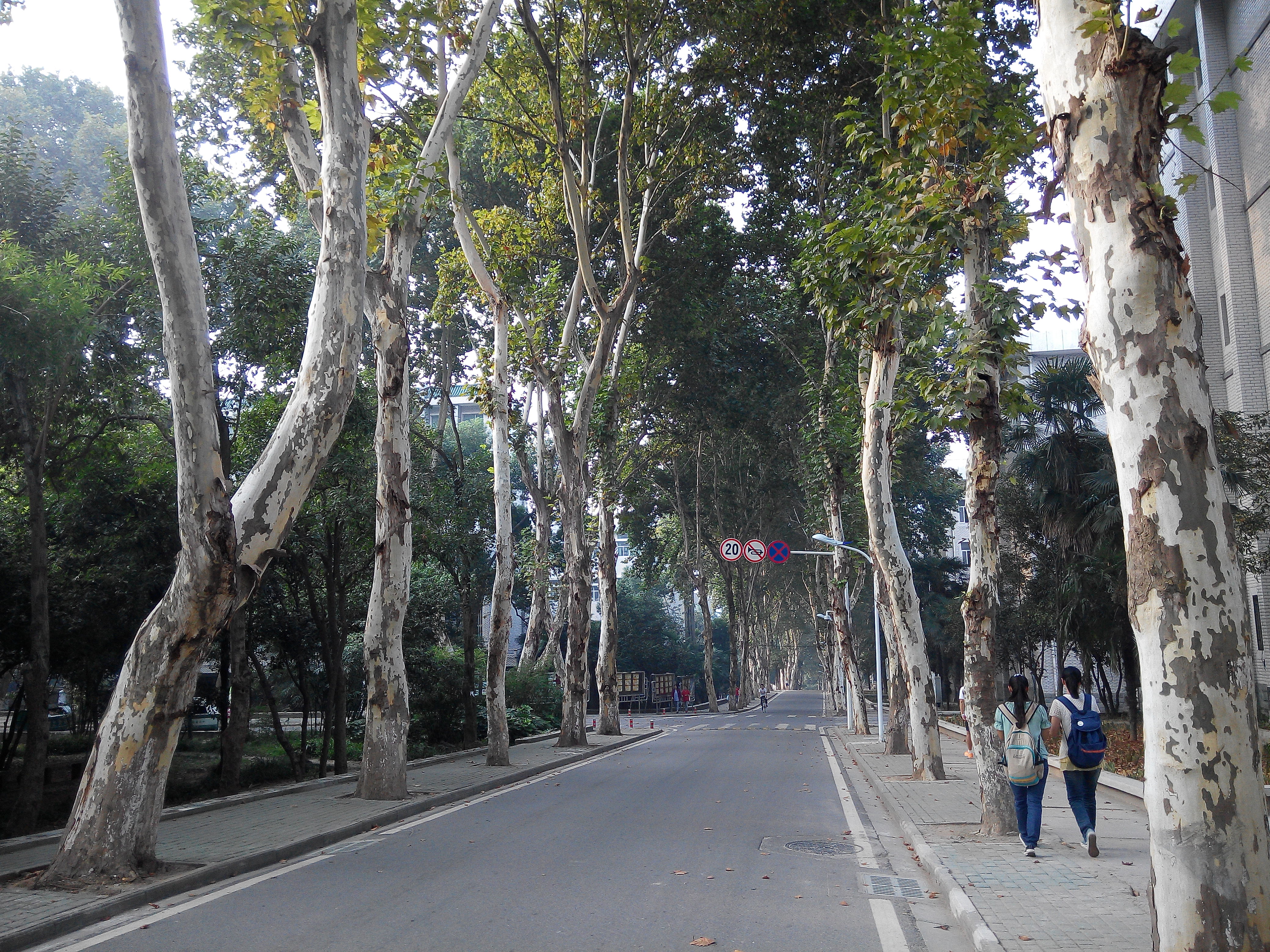
East Campus

The origin of the school originated in 1898 when Zhang Zhidong, the governor of Huguang, asked the Qing government to establish Hubei Institution of Technology. Wuhan University of Technology (WUT) was founded on May 27, 2000 from the former Wuhan University of Technology, Wuhan Transportation University and Wuhan Automotive Polytechnic University. Each of these three universities has its own uniquely important history.

The former Wuhan University of Technology dated back from three colleges, namely, Zhongnan Construction Engineering College in 1952, Shenyang Building Materials Industry College in 1958 and Beijing Institute of Building Engineering in 1958. Then in 1971, Beijing Institute of Building Engineering merged with Wuhan Construction Engineering School and thus formed Hubei Construction Industry College. Later in 1978, the college was awarded the title as national key university and then changed its name to Wuhan Institute of Building Materials. In 1985, the college changed its name to Wuhan University of Technology, which later passed the evaluation of "State 211 Project" in 1996 and entered into the direct administration of the Ministry of Education in 1998 before its merge with the other two universities in May 2000.

The former Wuhan Transportation University mainly originated from National Maritime Vocational School in 1946. Then in 1949, the college changed its name to Wuhan Transportation College. in 1952, the college changed its name to Wuhan River Transportation College. Later in 1957, the college changed its name to Wuhan University of Water Transportation Engineering which then received the discipline adjustment by the Ministry of Transportation in 1963. More importantly, the college merged with Wuhan River Transportation School and thus got its name as Wuhan University of Water Transportation Engineering. Later in 1993, the college was officially named as Wuhan Transportation University by the Ministry of Transportation before its merge with the other two universities in May 2000.

The former Wuhan Automotive Polytechnic University came from the original Wuhan Institute of Technology which was founded in 1958. In 1959, it was merged into Hubei Chemical Engineering College. Then in 1961, the college merged with the other two colleges, respectively, Wuhan Institute of Technology and Hubei Industry College and thus named itself Wuhan Institute of Technology. During the next fifteen years, the Institute underwent great changes and was forced to change its name due to China's Cultural Revolution. Then in 1979, the Institute regained its name as Wuhan Institute of Technology. Later from 1983 to 1994, the Institute showed its rapid development in many aspects. Then in 1995, the Institute changed its name to Wuhan Automotive Polytechnic University. What was more, in 1999, Hubei No.1 Mechanical Industry School and Hubei Energy Economy School were merged into the university. Later in May 2000, it merged with the other two universities mentioned in the beginning and thus formed Wuhan University of Technology.

== Academic ==
Currently, the university owns 23 academic schools, 9 state key disciplines, 74 Doctoral programs, 135 Master's programs as well as 82 Bachelor's programs. WUT has about 5,570 staff members, including 650 professors, 3 academicians of China Academy of Engineering and 3 academicians of China Academy of Science. Besides, over 36,000 undergraduates, 16000 postgraduates (including Master and PhD students), and 327 international students are studying at WUT.

The university has extensively established academic links with more than sixty external universities and institutions. The university has engaged more than one hundred famous foreign scholars as Concurrent or Honorary Professors for the university, and often receives experts, scholars and professors from other countries or regions to teach or do research. The university also sends abroad a number of teachers, professors, and scholars to study and to attend international academic conferences each year. Some of them have been engaged as Guest Professor, Special Professor or Lecturer by foreign host institutions. In 1950 the university began to admit foreign students and has awarded more than ten different countries' students ever since with a bachelor, master's degree or a certificate for further study.

=== Schools ===
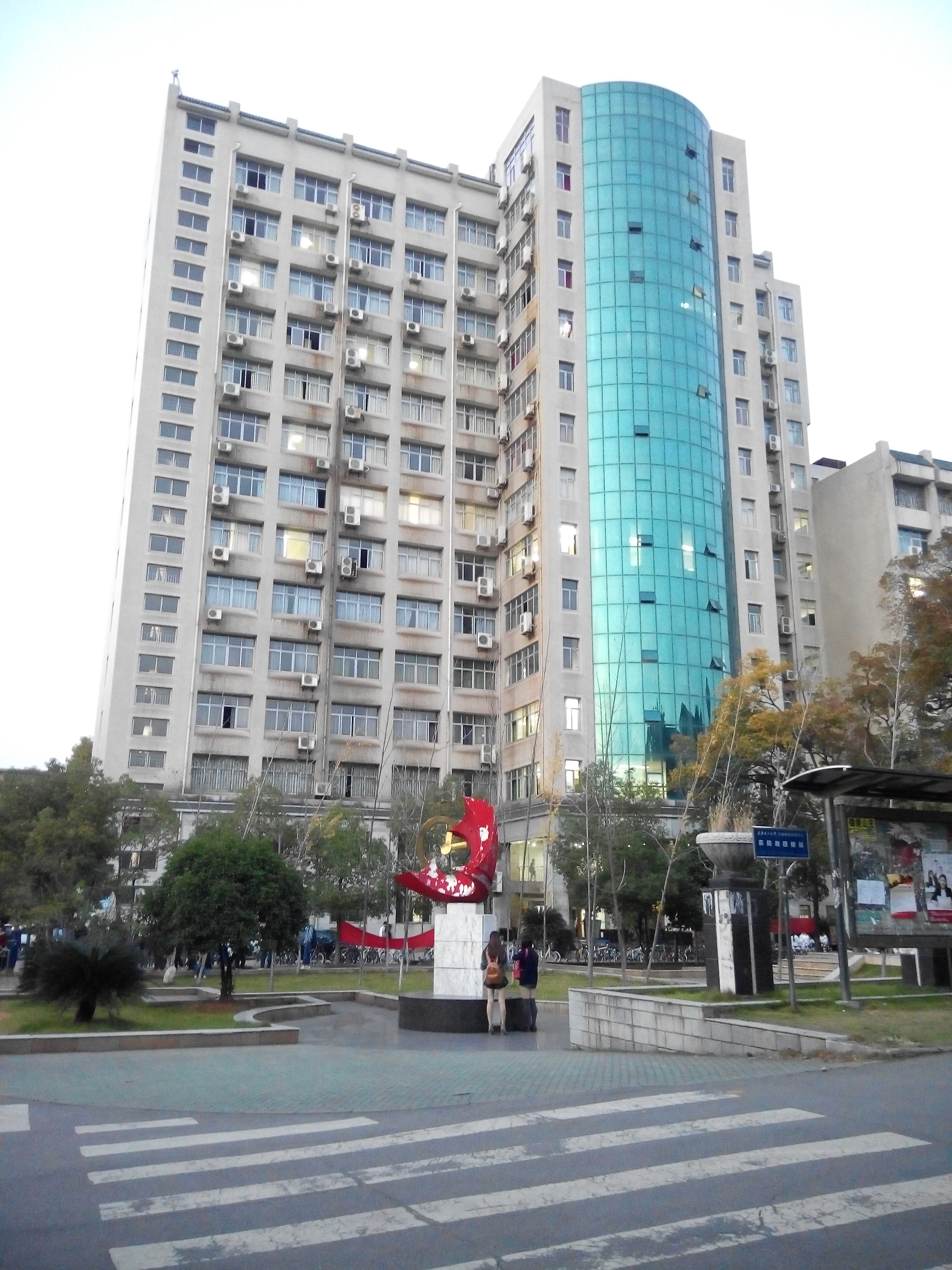
East Campus No.4 Teaching Building

- School of Materials Science and Engineering
- School of Automotive Engineering
- School of Transportation
- School of Naval Architecture, Ocean and Energy Power Engineering
- School of Mechanical and Electronic Engineering
- School of Energy and Power Engineering
- School of Resources and Environmental Engineering
- School of Information Engineering
- School of Computer Science and Technology
- School of Automation
- School of Civil Engineering and Architecture
- School of Navigation
- School of Logistics Engineering
- School of Chemistry, Chemical Engineering and Life Science
- School of Sciences
- School of Management
- School of Economics
- School of Law, Humanities and Sociology
- School of Art and Design
- School of Foreign Languages
- Institute of Higher Education
- School of Vocational Technology
- School of International Education
- School of On-line and Continuing Education
- Department of Physical Education

=== Research ===
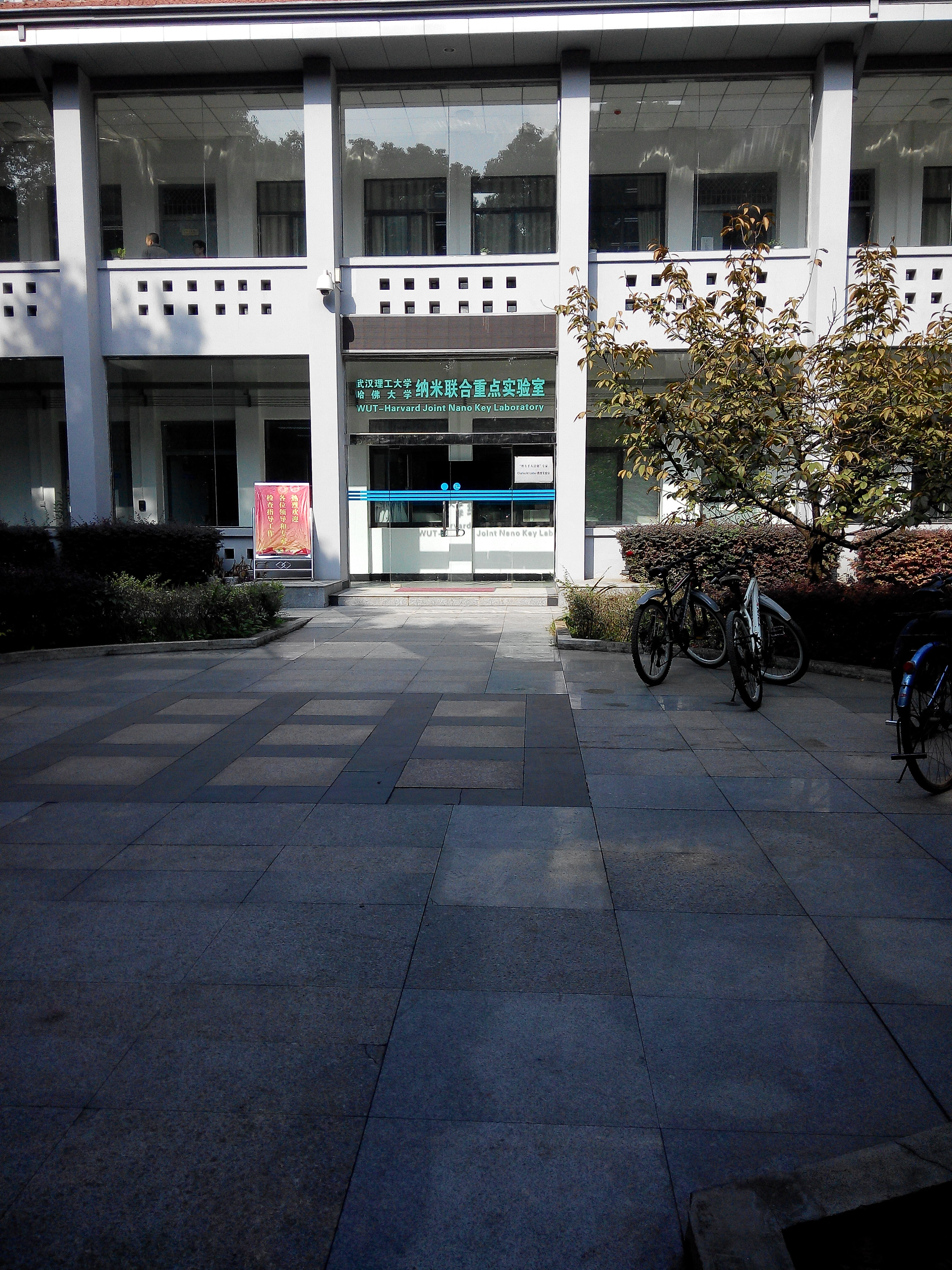
WUT-Harvard Joint Nano Key Laboratory, West Campus

WUT hosts 27 research centers including two State Key Laboratories, a State Engineering Laboratory and provincial or ministerial level laboratories in the areas of new materials, new energy, transportation and logistics, mechatronics and automobile, information technology as well as resources and environmental technology. In recent 10 years, WUT has obtained nearly RMB 3 billion of funding from government and industrial sectors for high-tech research and development, and has made a lot of innovative and important technological achievements. Meanwhile, the University has established its Science Park in Wuhan·China Optical Valley, covering an area of 58.7 hectares, where it has incubated and fostered more than 6 high-tech enterprises based on new materials, fiber optical sensors, high-speed shipping, new energy technology and advanced manufacturing. In 2010, the total revenue of the Science Park reached RMB1.58 billion.

WUT partners with 167 large enterprises in the three sectors of building materials and construction industry, transportation industry and automobile industry. The three Boards hold annual meetings regularly to discuss the important issues concerning the mutual development between the university and the three industrial sectors. WUT also established cooperative relations for students exchange and scientific research with more than 100 foreign universities and research institutions from USA, UK, Japan, France, Australia, Russia and the Netherlands, etc. and invited over 200 international famous scholars to be guest professors or honorary professors.

In 2006 and 2007, the State Administration of Foreign Experts Affairs and the Ministry of Education made a joint approval of establishing a state base in WUT for discipline innovation and talent import in the field of advanced materials technology and high-speed shipping technology. In 2008, the Ministry of Science and Technology approved WUT to establish an internationally joint research center for advanced materials technology. In 2010, Thermoelectric Materials Research Team of WUT Entered China-US Clean Energy Joint Research Centre.

There is a partnership between the University of Wales Trinity Saint David and the Wuhan University of Technology.

== Campus ==
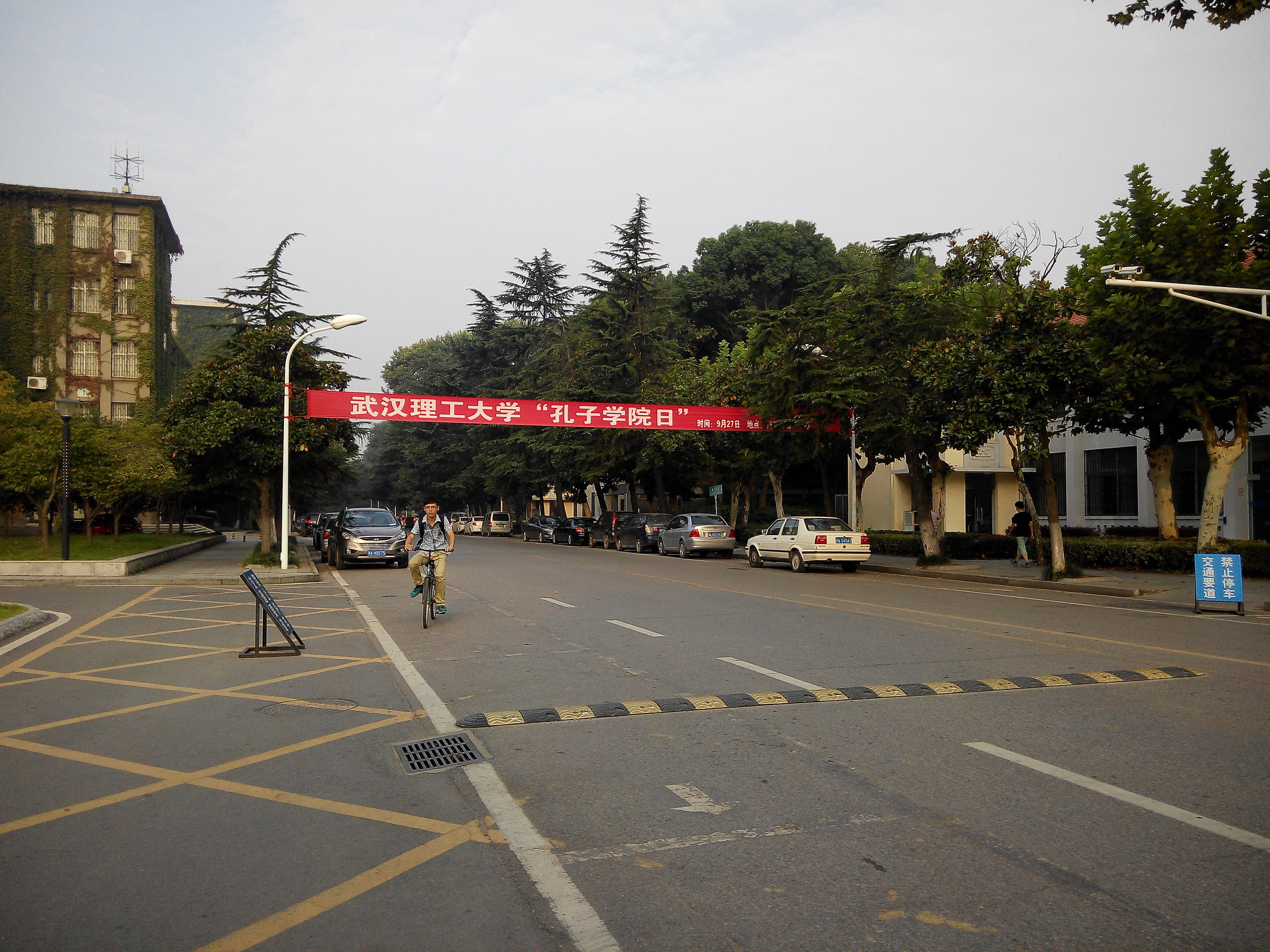
West Campus

Wuhan University of Technology (WUT) is located in Wuhan, the largest city in Central China and a Chinese famous "River City". The university has three main campuses, namely, the Mafangshan Campus 马房山 (which is divided into East Campus Community and West Campus Community), the Yujiatou Campus and the South Lake new Campus, with a total occupying land area of 267 hectares. Bordering the South Lake, the new university is situated on the south bank of Yangtze River in Wuhan. It has two main campuses, one at Mafangshan Hill and one at Yujiatou in Wuchang. The total area of the campus is 450 acres (1.8 km^{2}). WUT has a building floorage of 1,100,000 square meters and it possesses three libraries with a stock of 2,720,000 books.

== Rankings ==
University rankings

Global – Overall
- ARWU World: 301–400
- QS World: 951-1000 (206)
- THE World: 801–1000
- USNWR Global: 837

Regional – Overall
- QS Asia: 2026 (2025)

Wuhan University of Technology ranked 39th in Wu Shulian's university ranking in 2008, one of the most popular university rankings in China. This placed it third among universities in Wuhan, after Huazhong University of Science and Technology and Wuhan University. According to the world university rankings 2013 by Times Higher Education, Wuhan University of Technology ranked 58th in Asian (8th in P.R. China and between 301st to 350th in the world). In the inaugural BRICS & Emerging Economies Rankings 2014, Wuhan University of Technology was ranked 28th overall and 9th in China, thus becoming the best ranked university in the city of Wuhan.

== Gallery ==
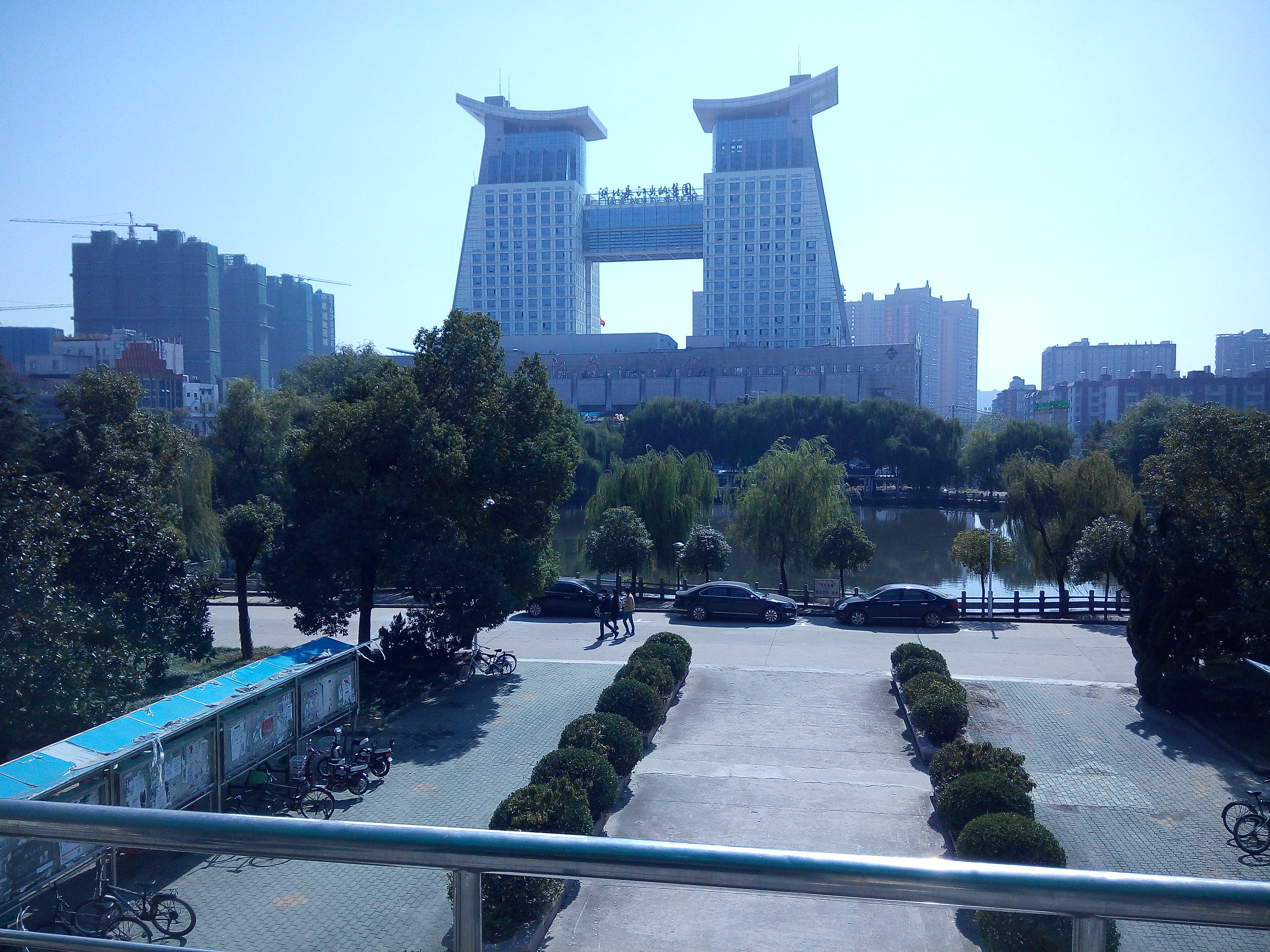
Jianhu Campus

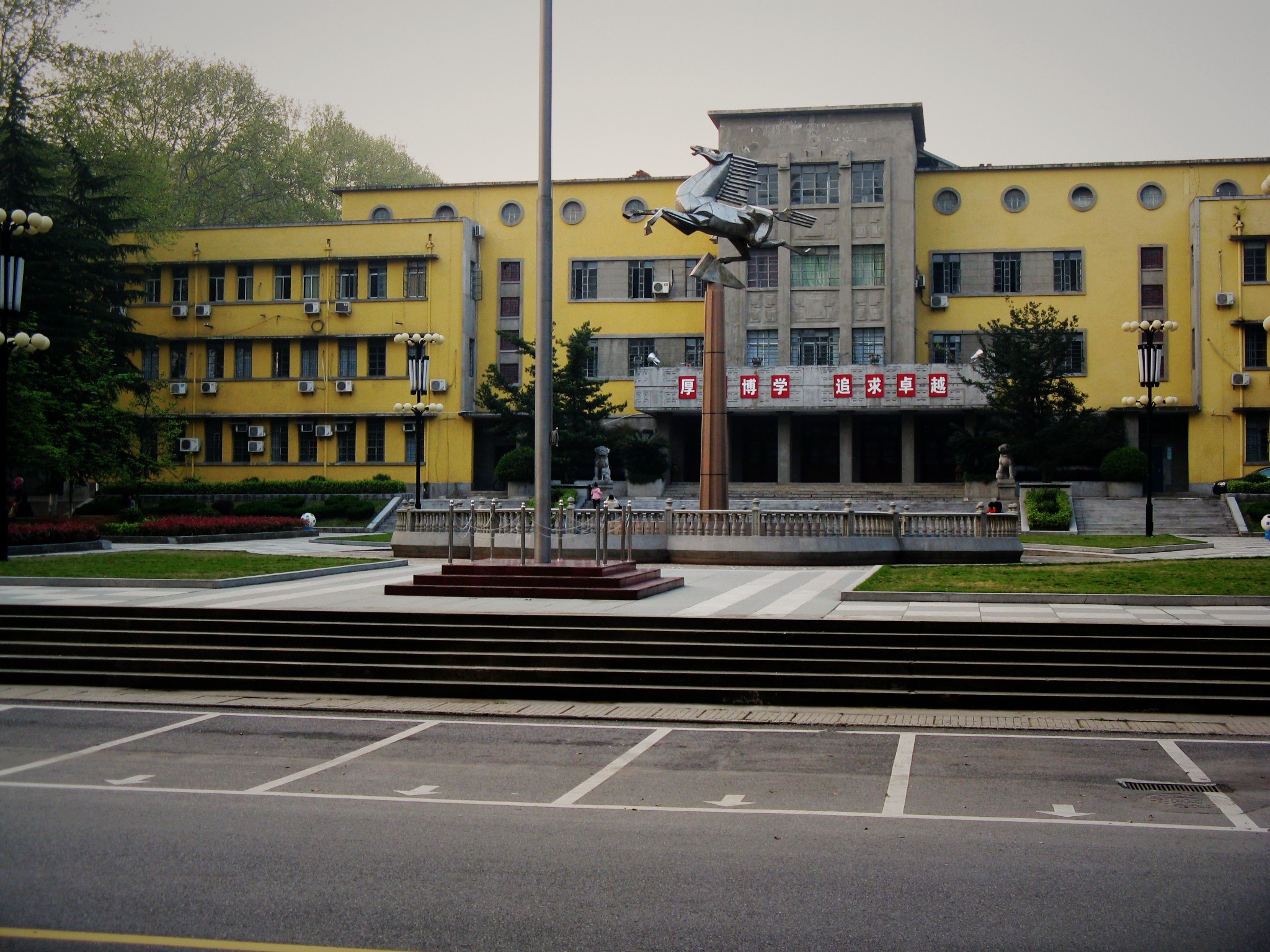
Feima Square (飞马广场), West Campus

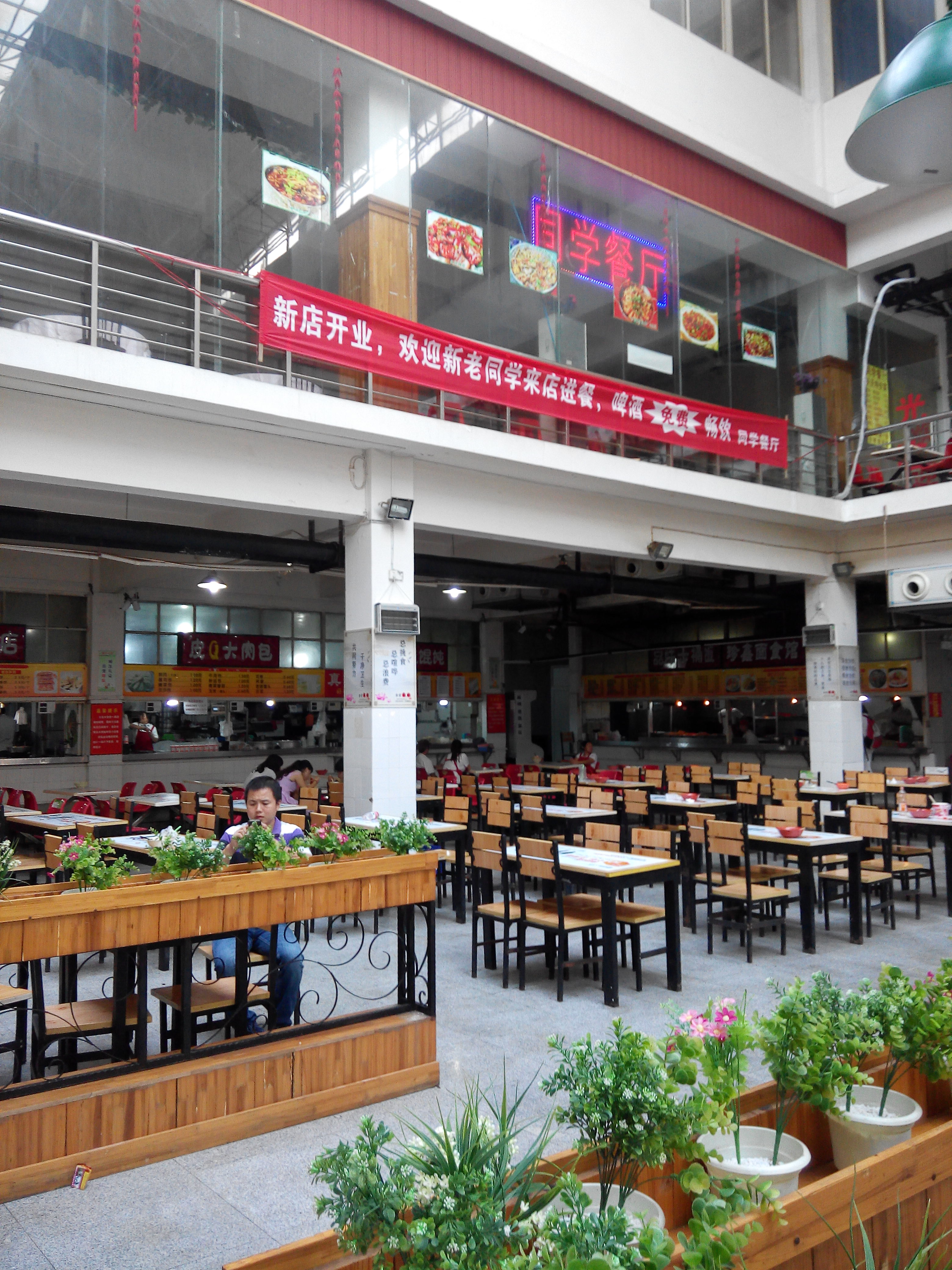
Shengsheng Canteen

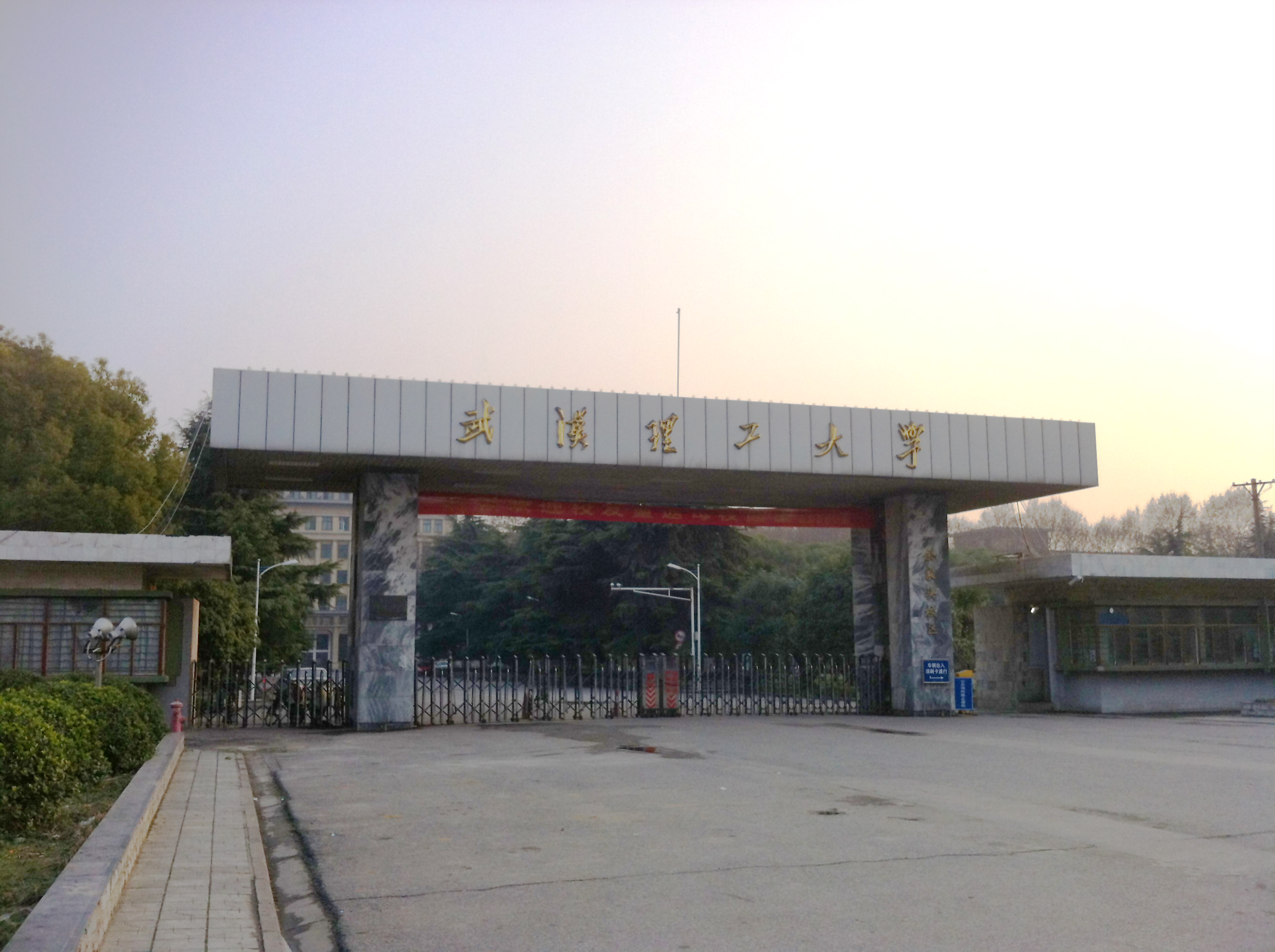
Yujiatou

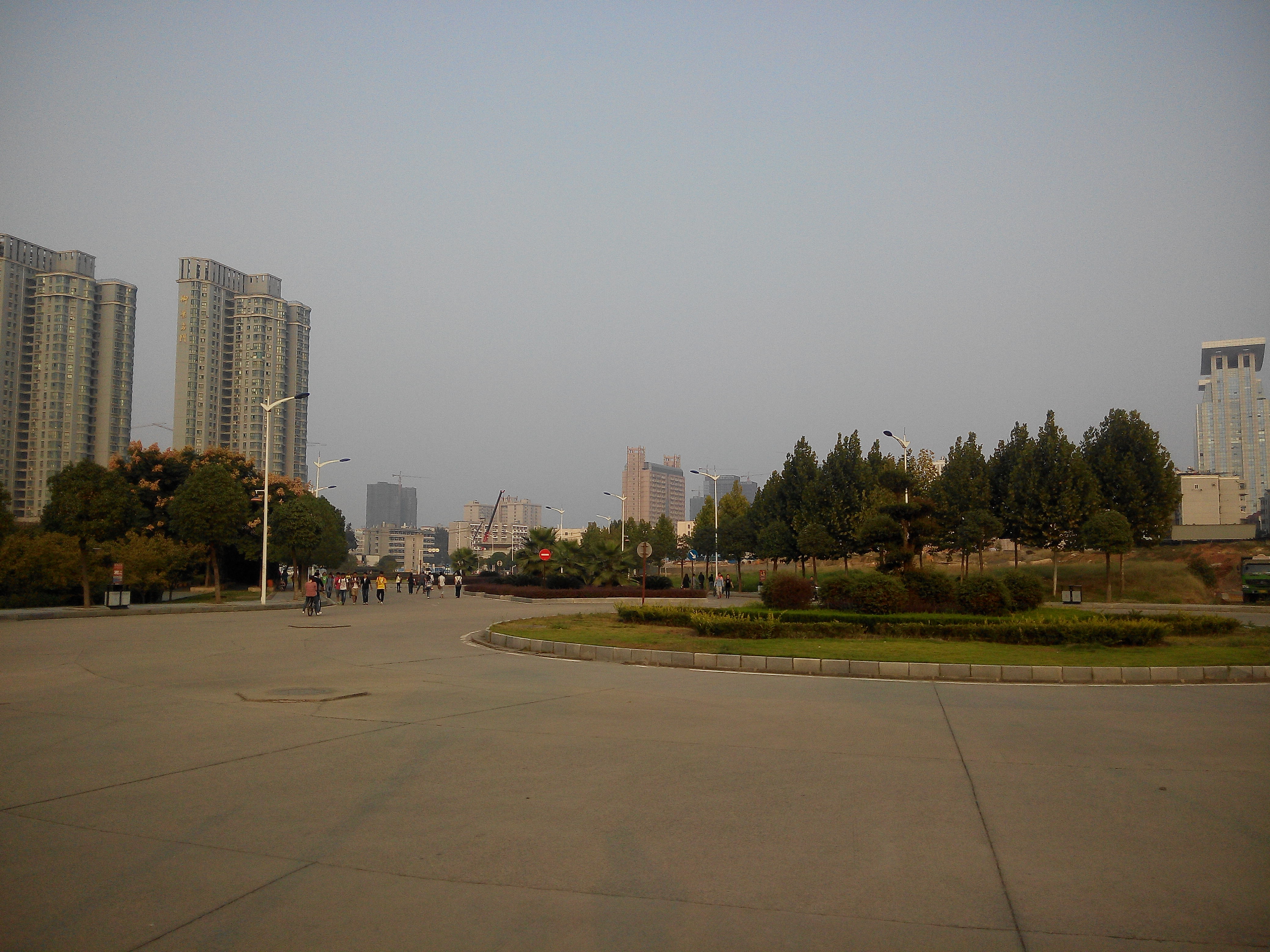
South Lake Campus
