= Zhongnan Road station =

Wuhan Metro station

Zhongnan Road 中南路 metro
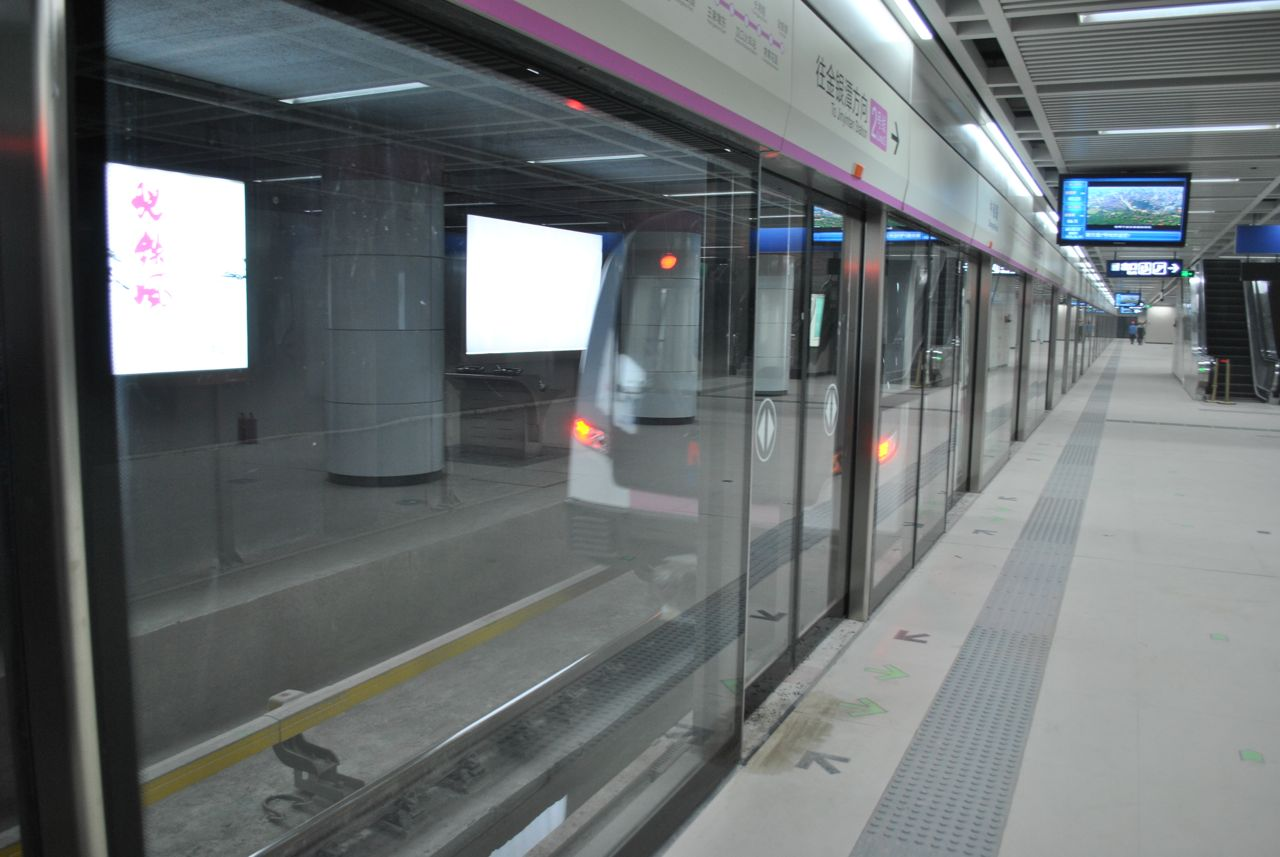

General information
- Location: Wuchang District, Wuhan, Hubei; China
- Coordinates: 30°32′21″N 114°19′37″E
- Operated by: Wuhan Metro Co., Ltd
- Lines: Line 2; Line 4
- Platforms: 4 (2 island platforms)

Construction
- Structure type: Underground

History
- Opened: December 28, 2012; 13 years ago (Line 2); December 28, 2013; 12 years ago (Line 4)

Services
Preceding station	Wuhan Metro	Following station
Hongshan Square towards Tianhe International Airport	Line 2	Baotong Temple towards Fozuling
Meiyuanxiaoqu towards Bailin	Line 4	Hongshan Square towards Wuhan Railway Station
Location

Zhongnan Road Station (Chinese: 中南路站) is an interchange station of Line 2 and Line 4 of Wuhan Metro. It entered revenue service on December 28, 2012. It is located in Wuchang District.

== Station layout ==
G	Entrances and Exits	Exits A-F
B1	Concourse	Faregates, Station Agent, Shops
B2	Eastbound	← Line 4 towards Wuhan (Hongshan Square)
B2	Island platform, doors will open on the left/right
B2	Northbound	← Line 2 towards Tianhe International Airport (Hongshan Square)
B2	Southbound	Line 2 towards Fozuling (Baotong Temple) →
B2	Island platform, doors will open on the left/right
B2	Westbound	Line 4 towards Bailin (Meiyuanxiaoqu) →

== Gallery ==
=== Station ===
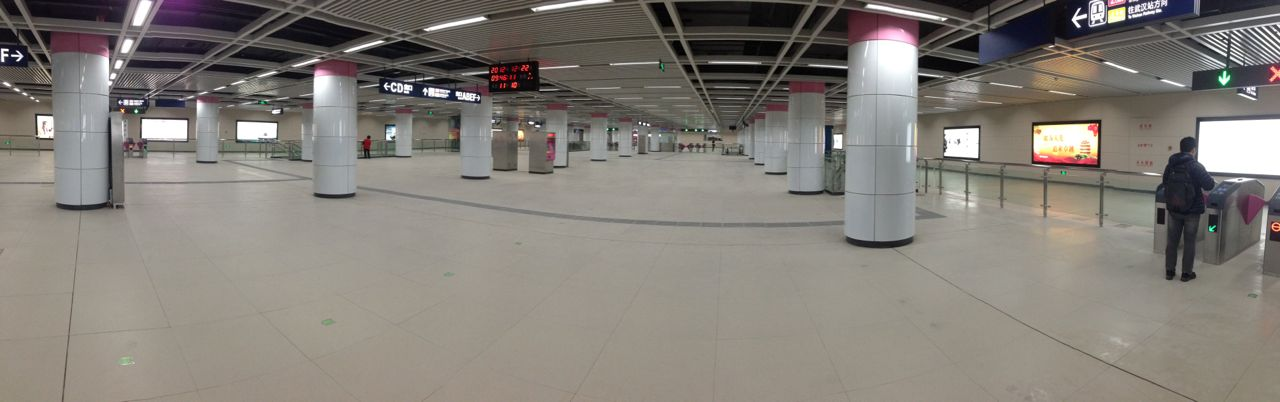
Panorama of the concourse
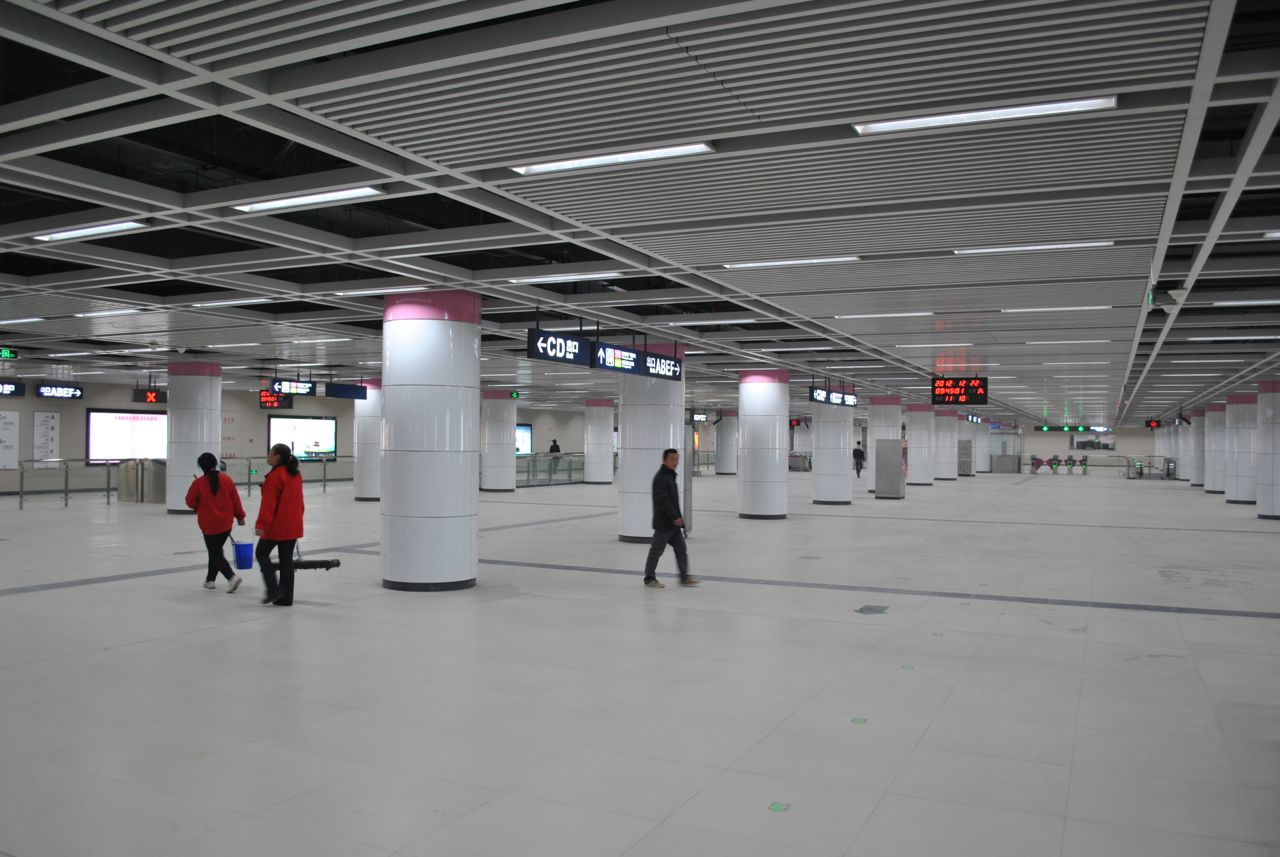
Station hall

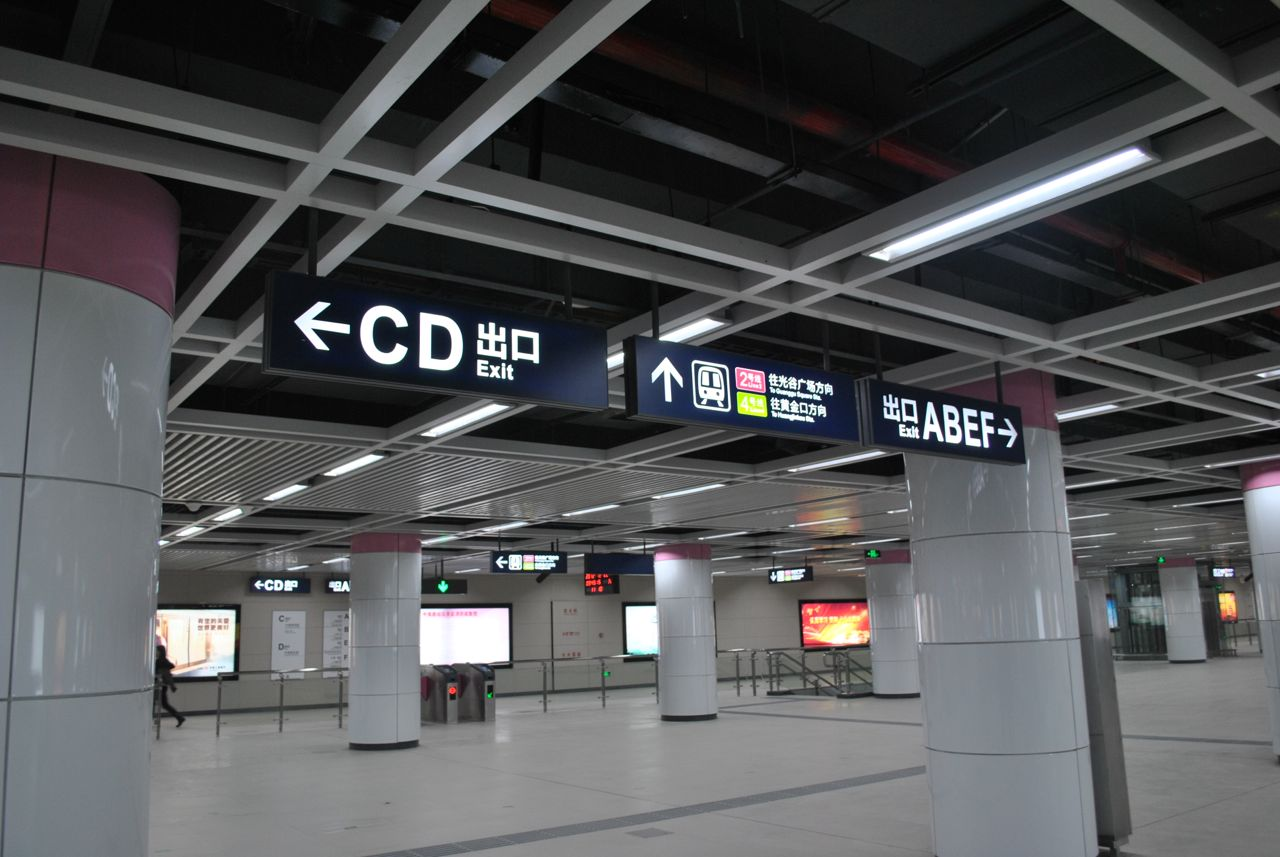

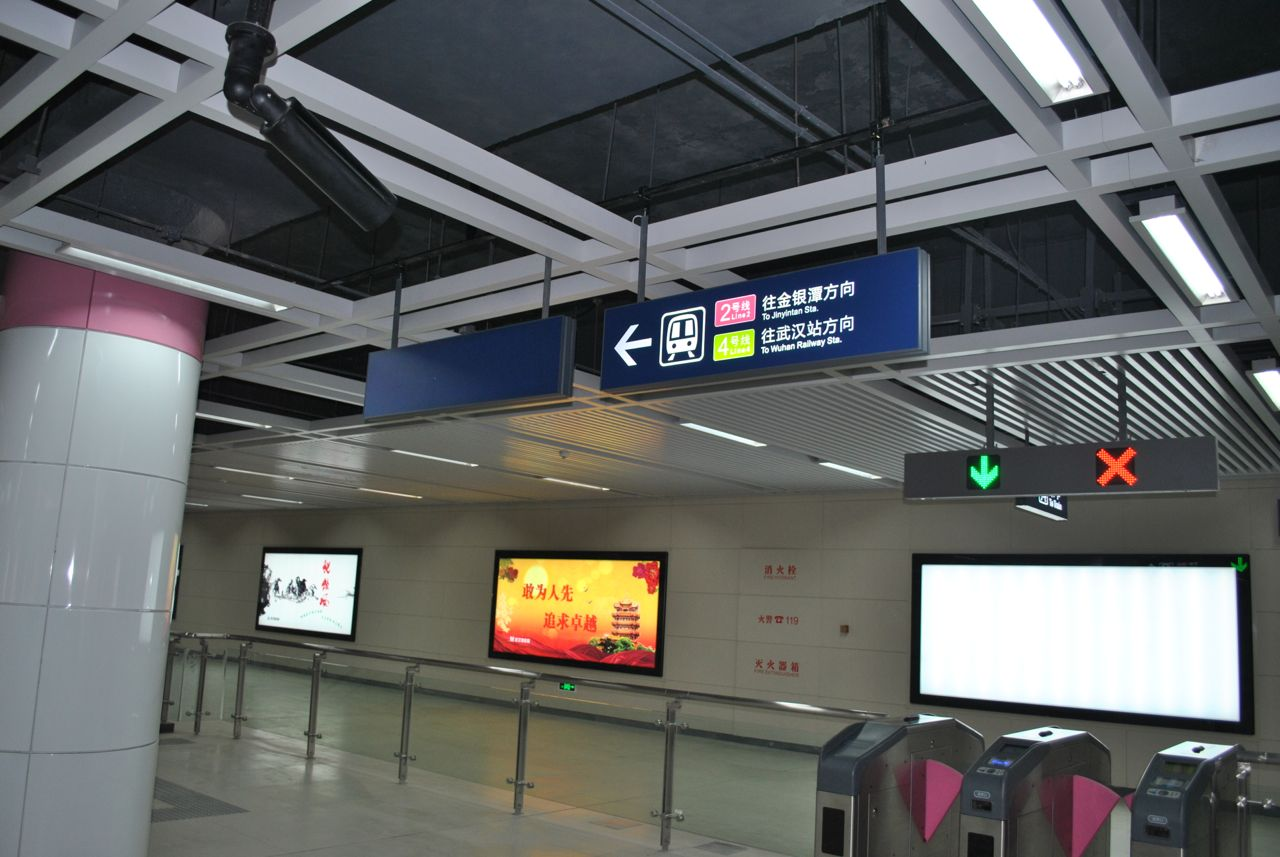

=== Entrance ===
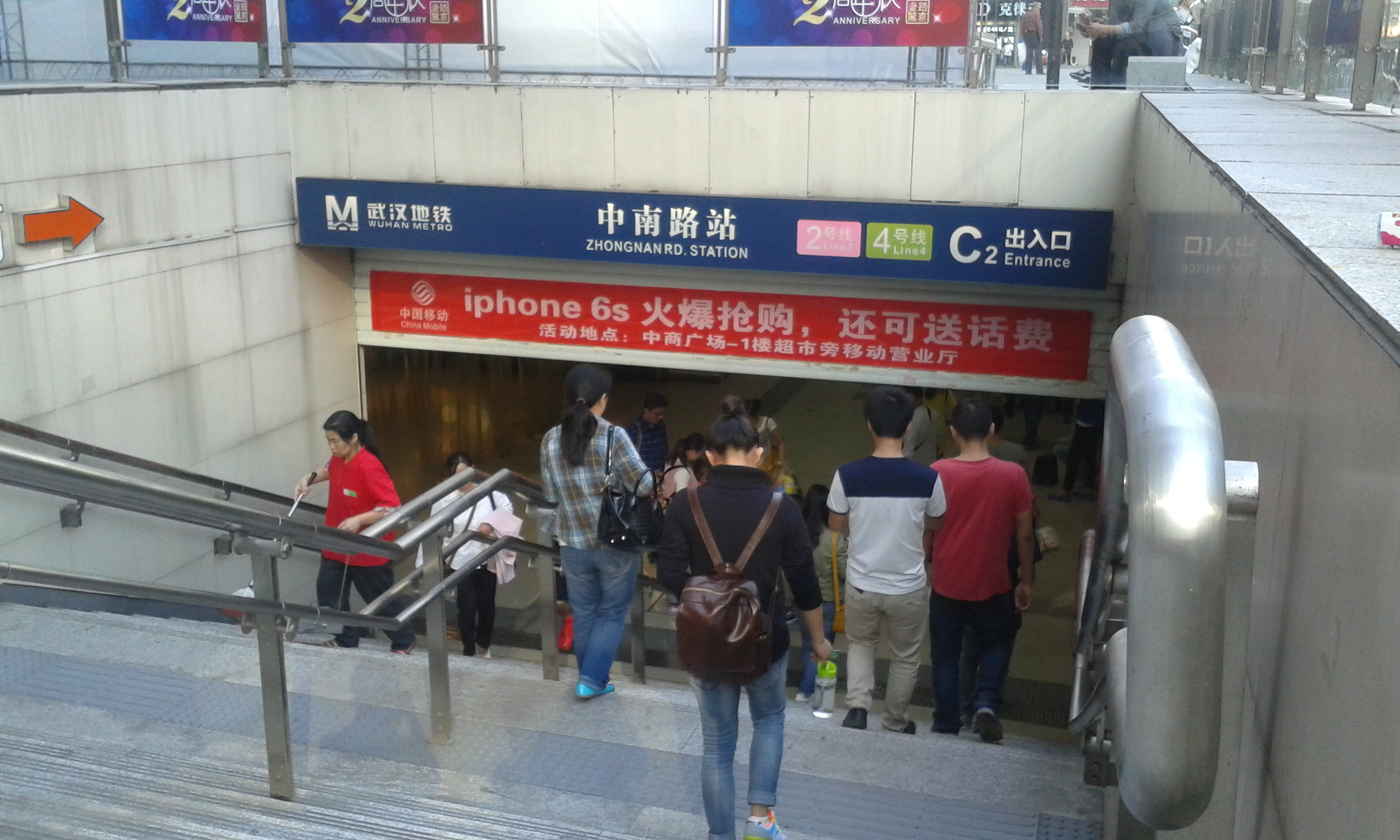
Entrance C2

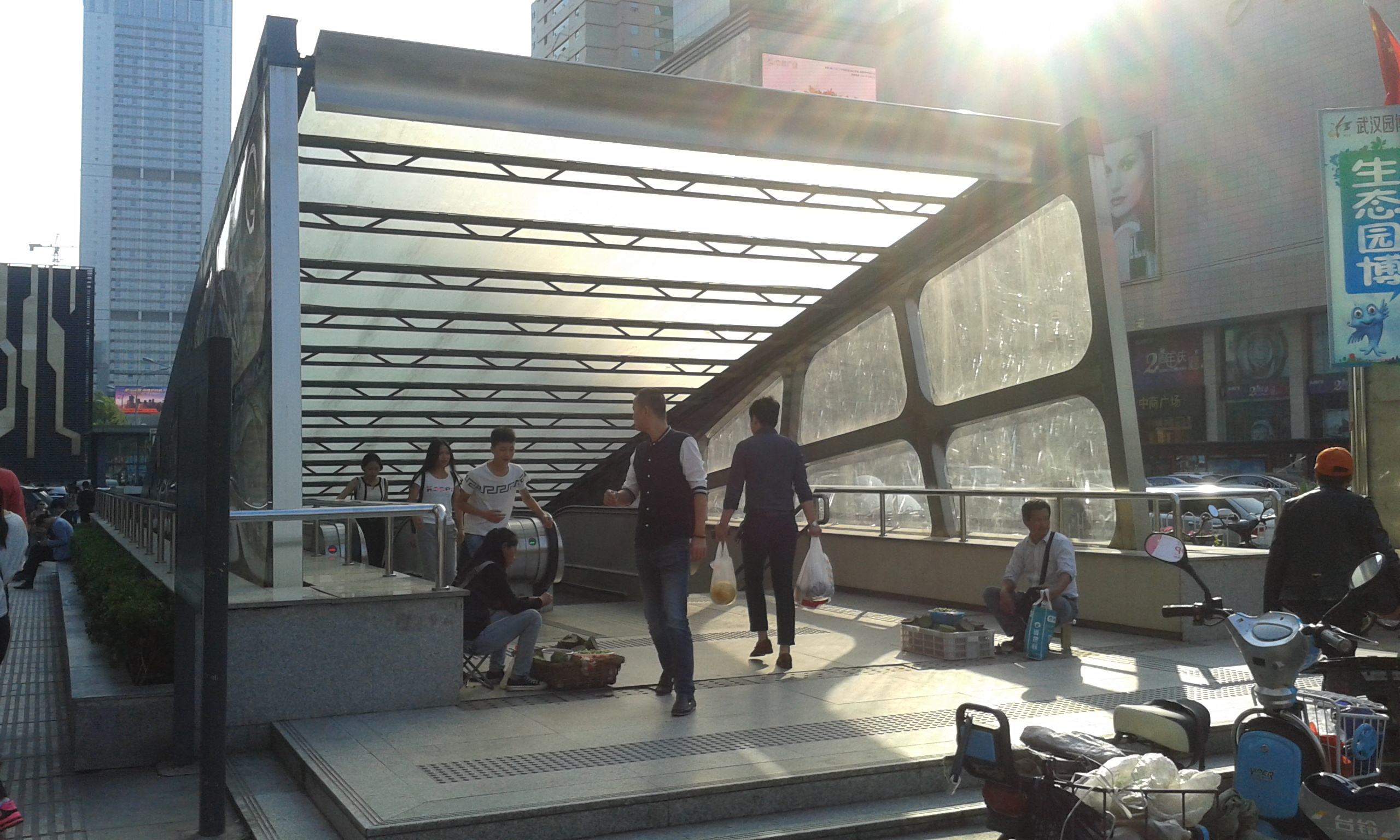
Entrance D1

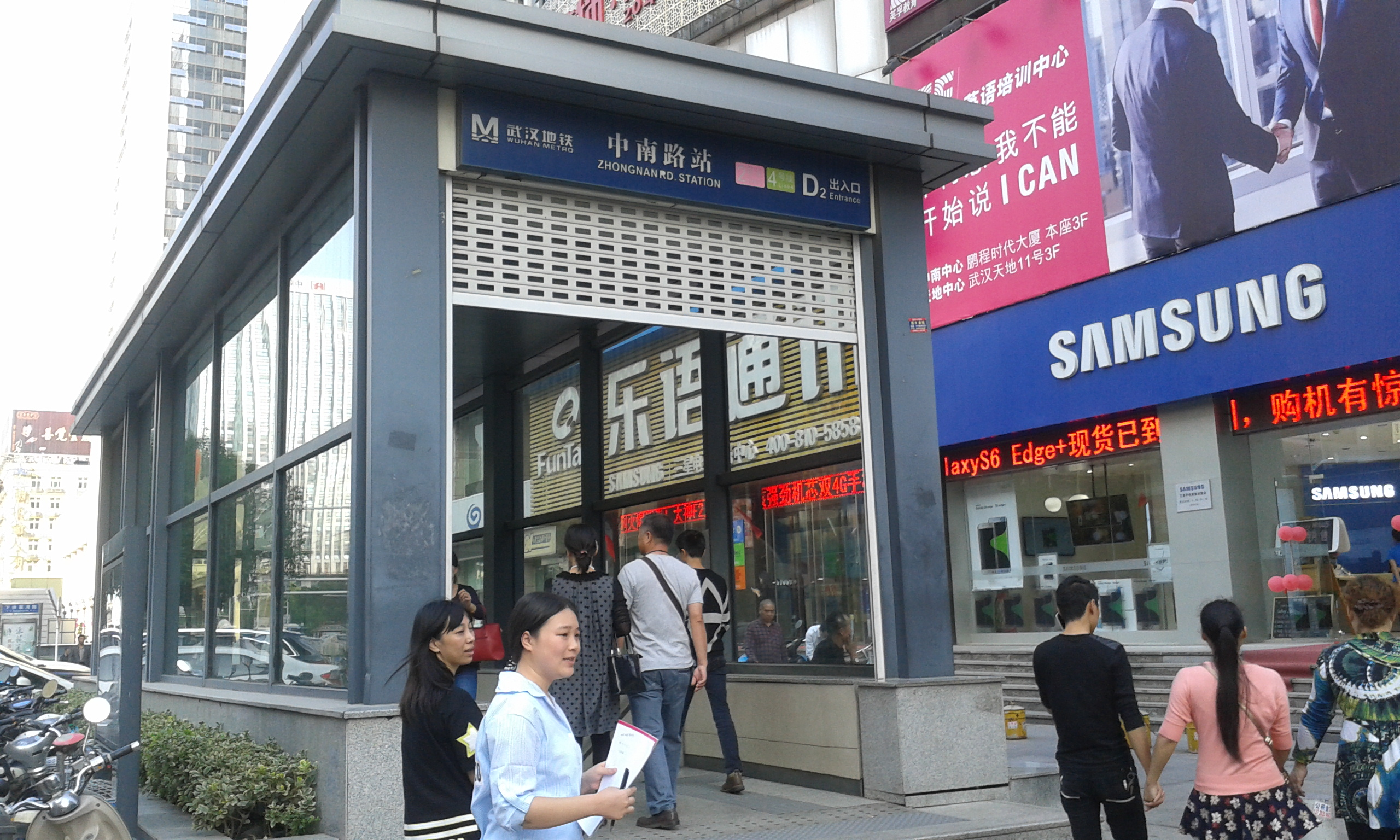
Entrance D2

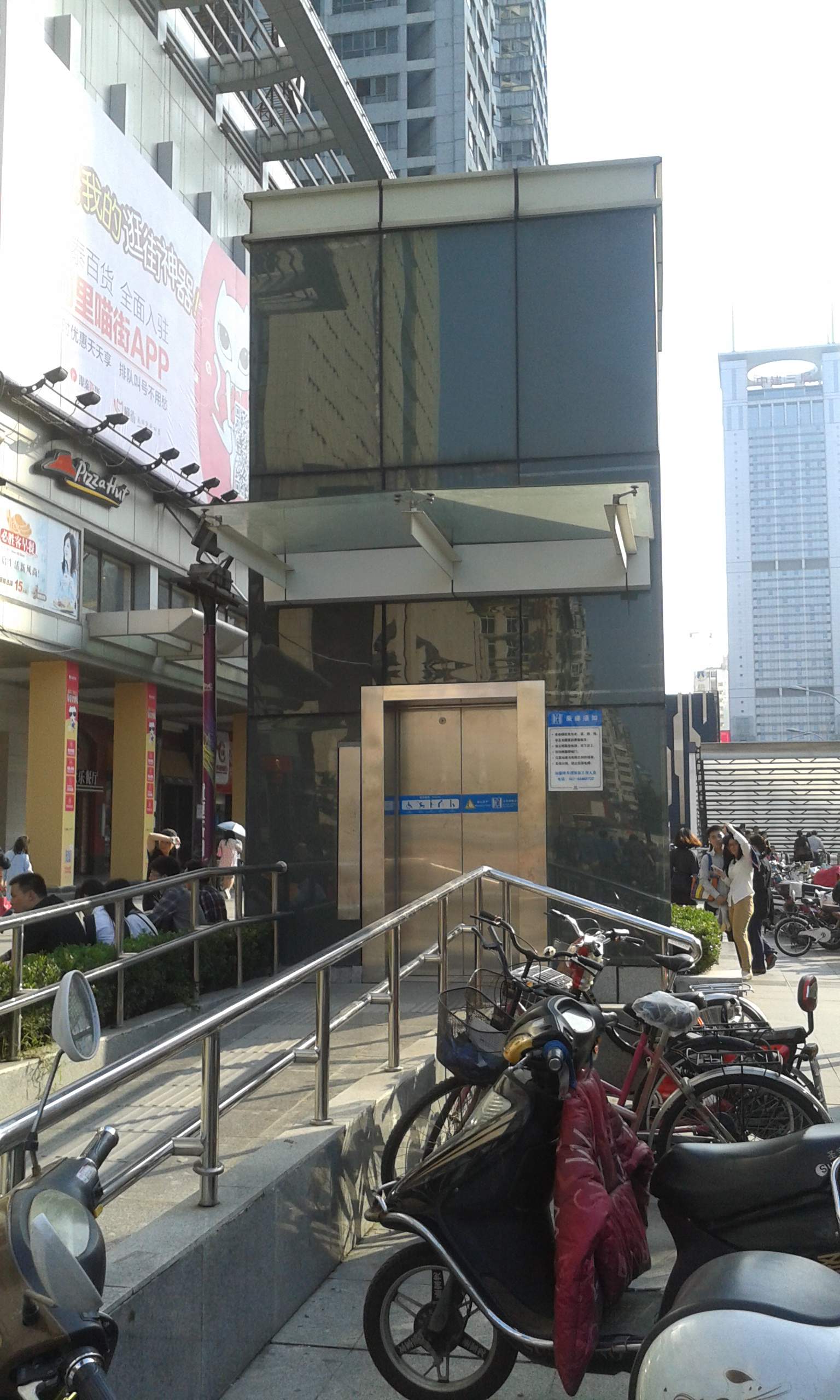
Elevator at Entrance E

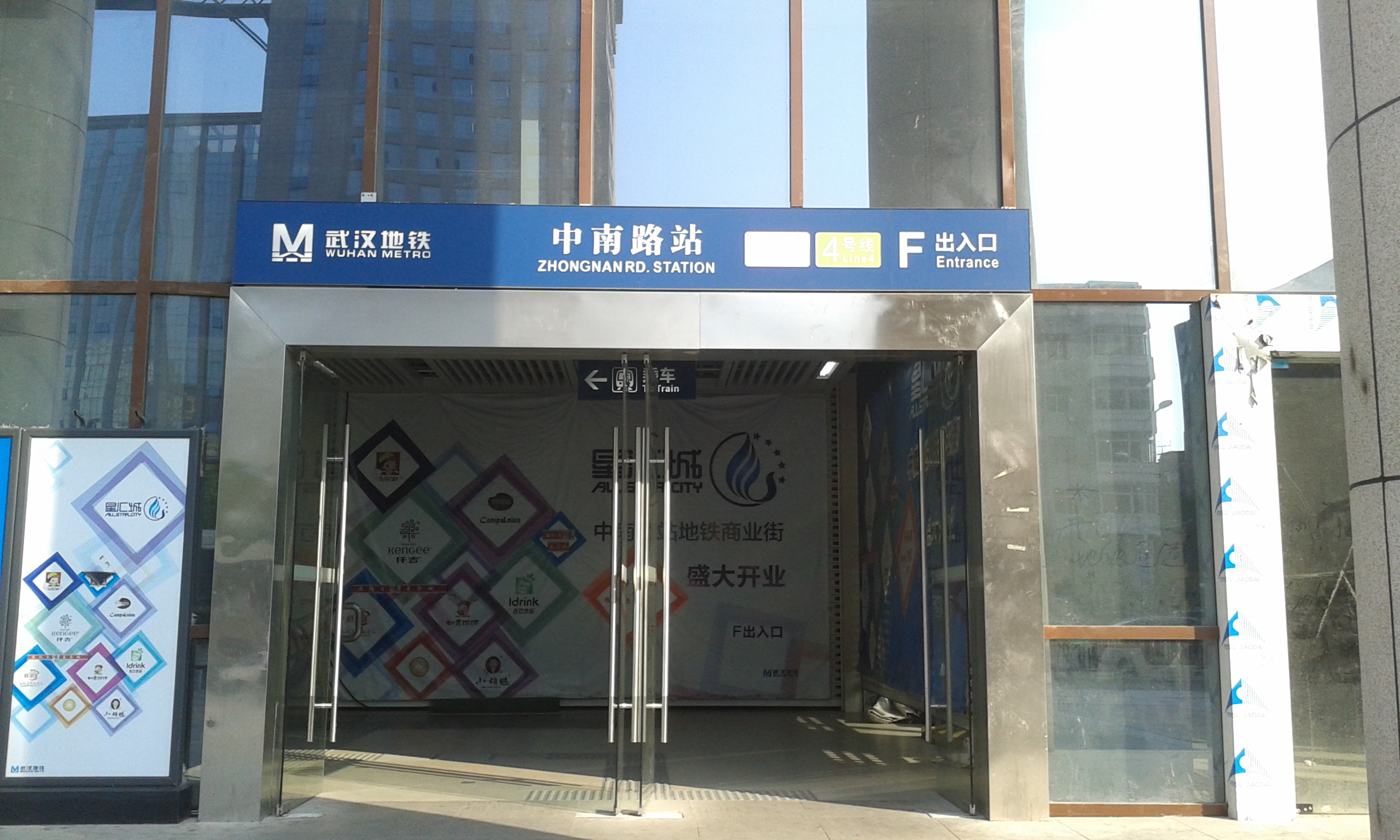
Entrance F

== Paired Cross-Platform Transfer ==
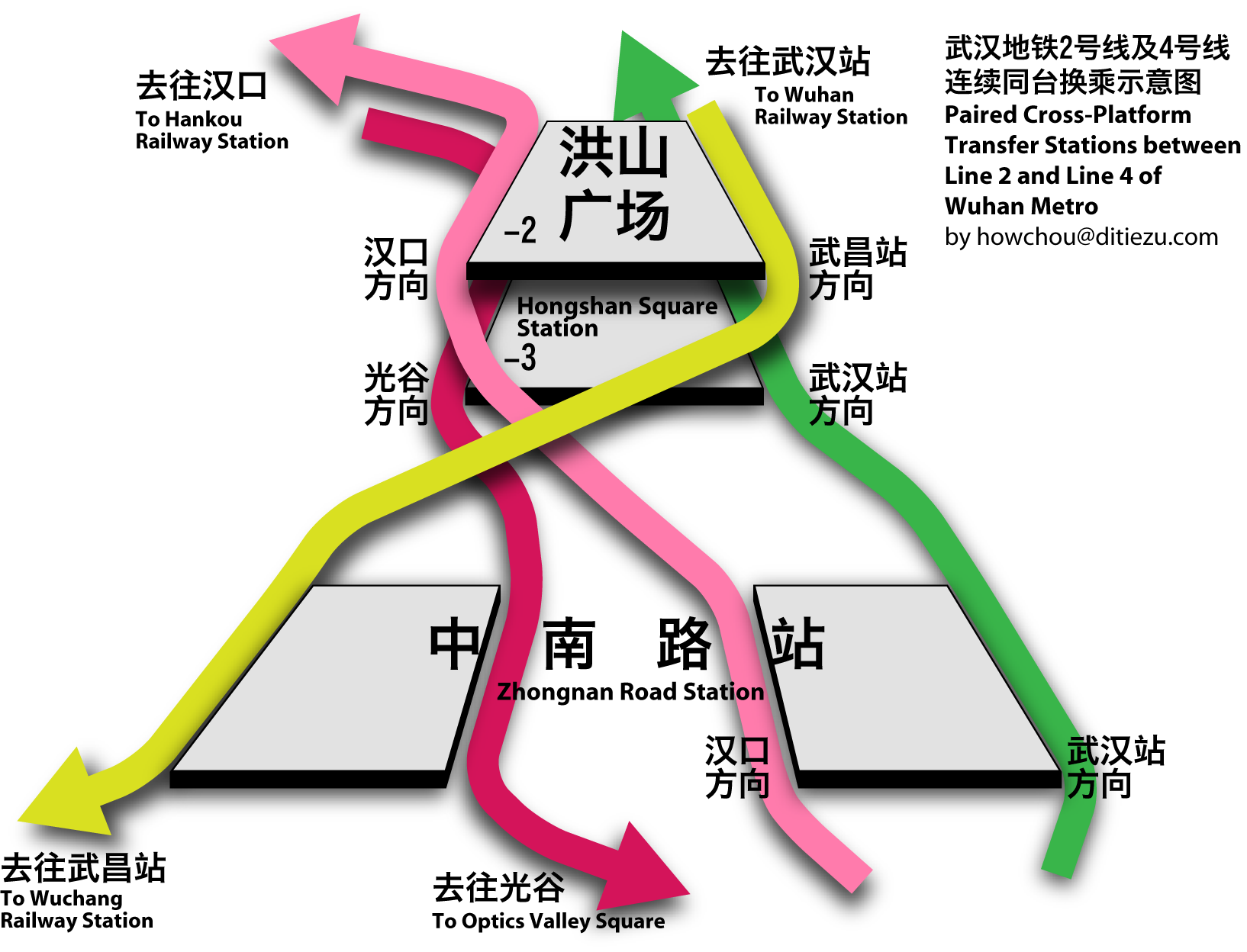
3D map

2D map

Zhongnan Road Station offers paired cross-platform interchange for passengers riding between 4 directions of the two lines. The configuration for the two stations is similar to that of Mong Kok and Prince Edward stations in Hong Kong's Mass Transit Railway.

Passengers riding on Line 2 from Hankou wishing to reach Wuchang railway station, can transfer at Zhongnan Road Station by crossing the platform.
