= Hongshan Square station =

Wuhan Metro station

Hongshan Square 洪山广场 metro
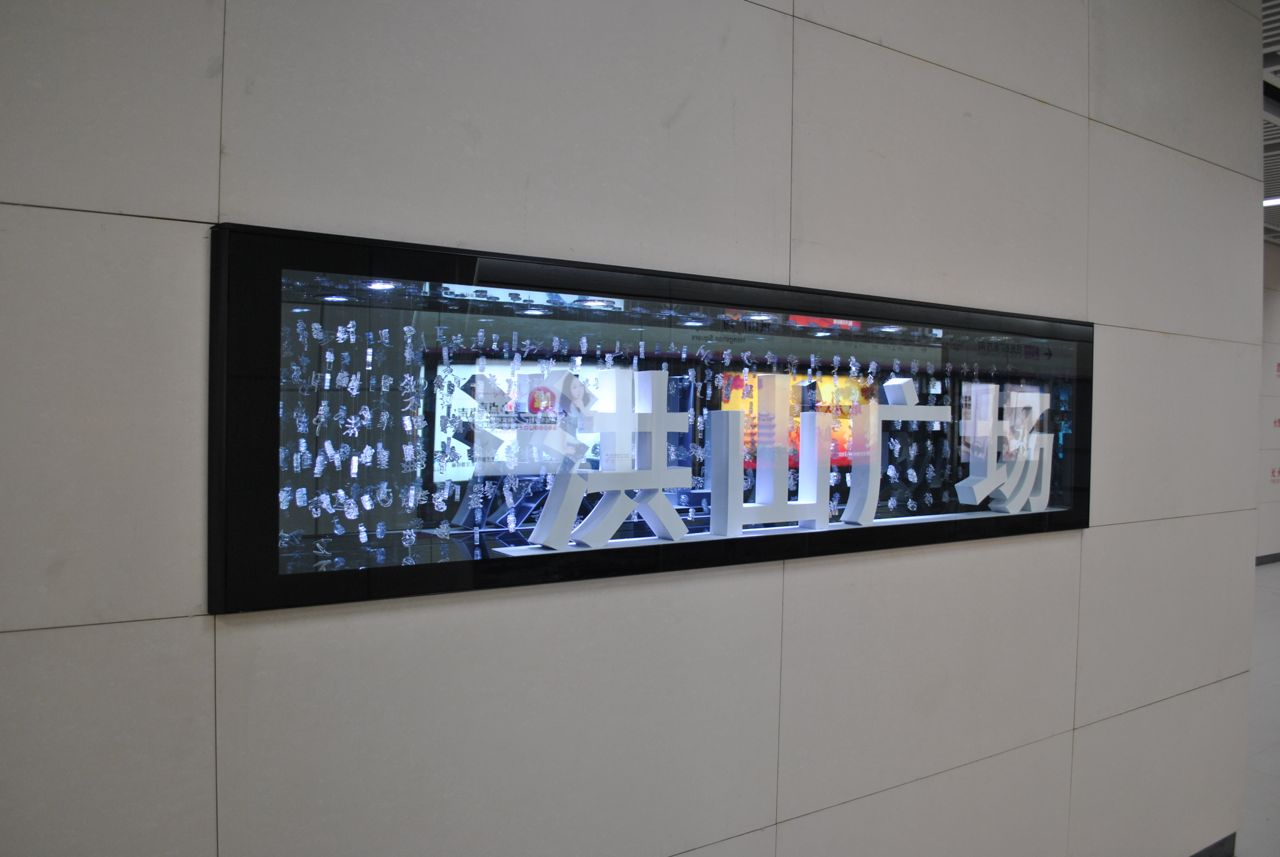

General information
- Location: Wuchang District, Wuhan, Hubei; China
- Coordinates: 30°32′50″N 114°19′51″E
- Operator: Wuhan Metro Co., Ltd
- Lines: Line 2; Line 4
- Platforms: 4 (2 island platforms)

Construction
- Structure type: Underground

History
- Opened: December 28, 2012; 13 years ago (Line 2); December 28, 2013; 12 years ago (Line 4)

Services
Preceding station	Wuhan Metro	Following station
Xiaoguishan towards Tianhe International Airport	Line 2	Zhongnan Road towards Fozuling
Zhongnan Road towards Bailin	Line 4	Chuhe Hanjie towards Wuhan Railway Station
Location

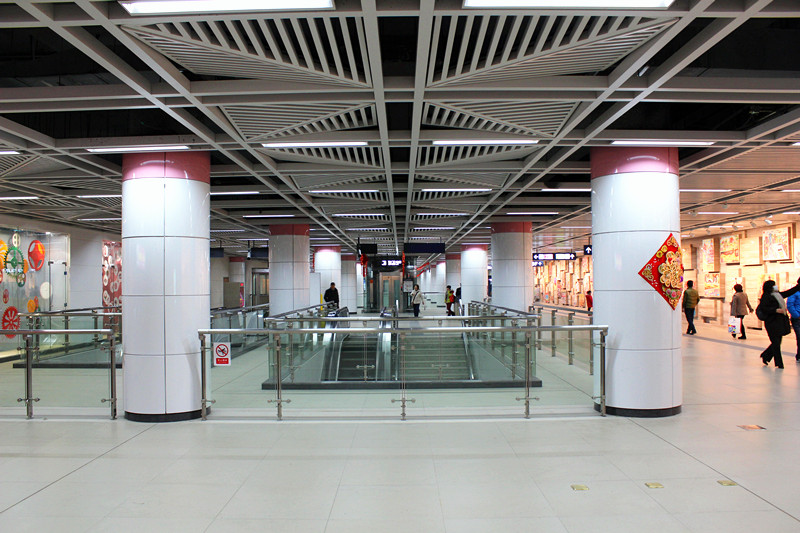
Station Hall

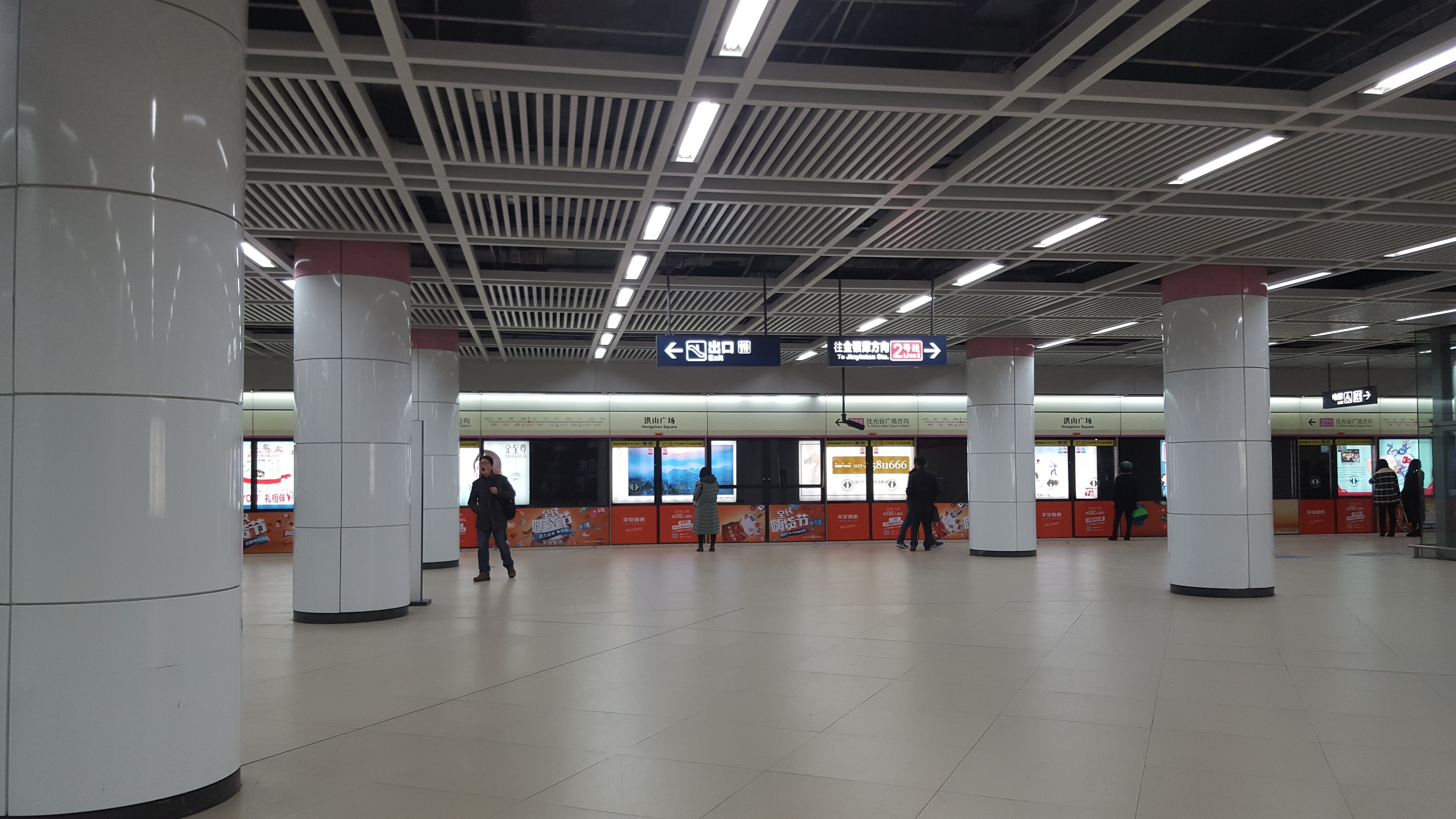
Platform of Line 2

Hongshan Square Station (Chinese: 洪山广场站) is an interchange station of Line 2 and Line 4 of Wuhan Metro. It entered revenue service on December 28, 2012. It is located in Wuchang District.

== Station layout ==
G	Entrances and Exits	Exits A, B, D-F
B1	Concourse	Faregates, Station Agent, Shops
B2	Westbound	Line 4 towards Bailin (Zhongnan Road) →
B2	Island platform, doors will open on the right
B2	Northbound	← Line 2 towards Tianhe International Airport (Xiaoguishan)
B3	Eastbound	← Line 4 towards Wuhan railway station (Chuhe Hanjie)
B3	Island platform, doors will open on the left
B3	Southbound	Line 2 towards Fozuling (Zhongnan Road) →

== Gallery ==
=== Station ===
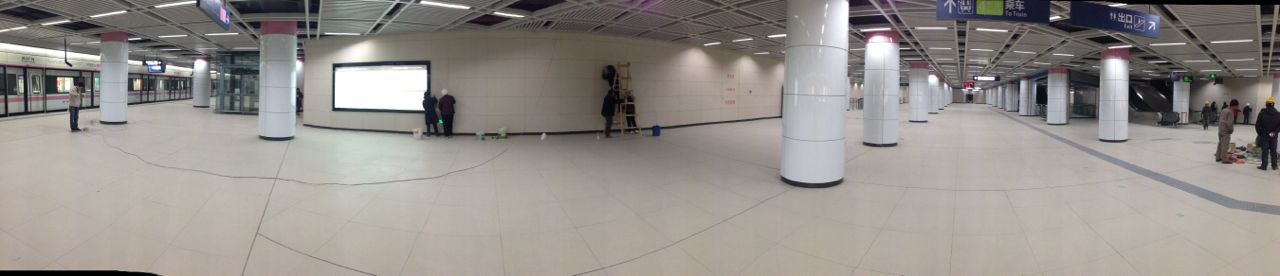
Platform panorama
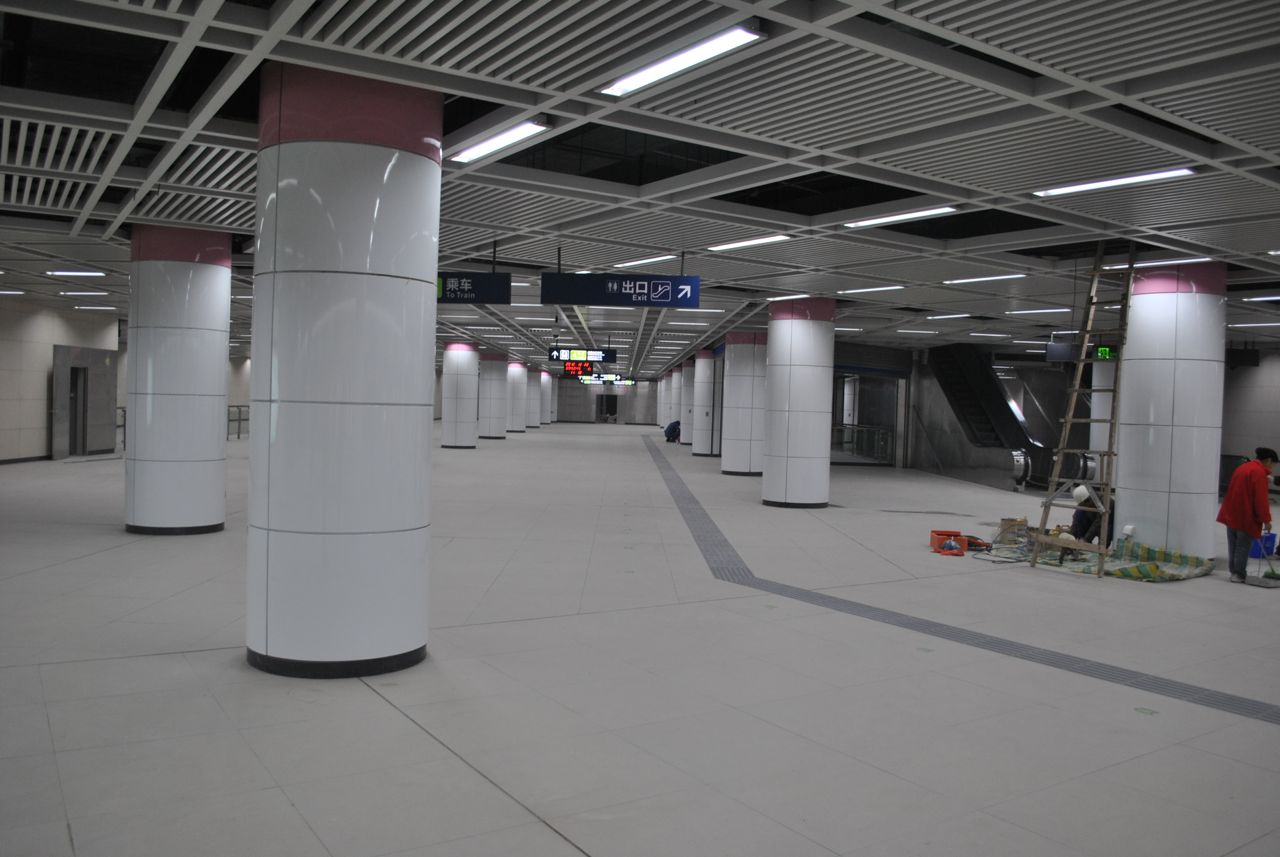
Station Hall

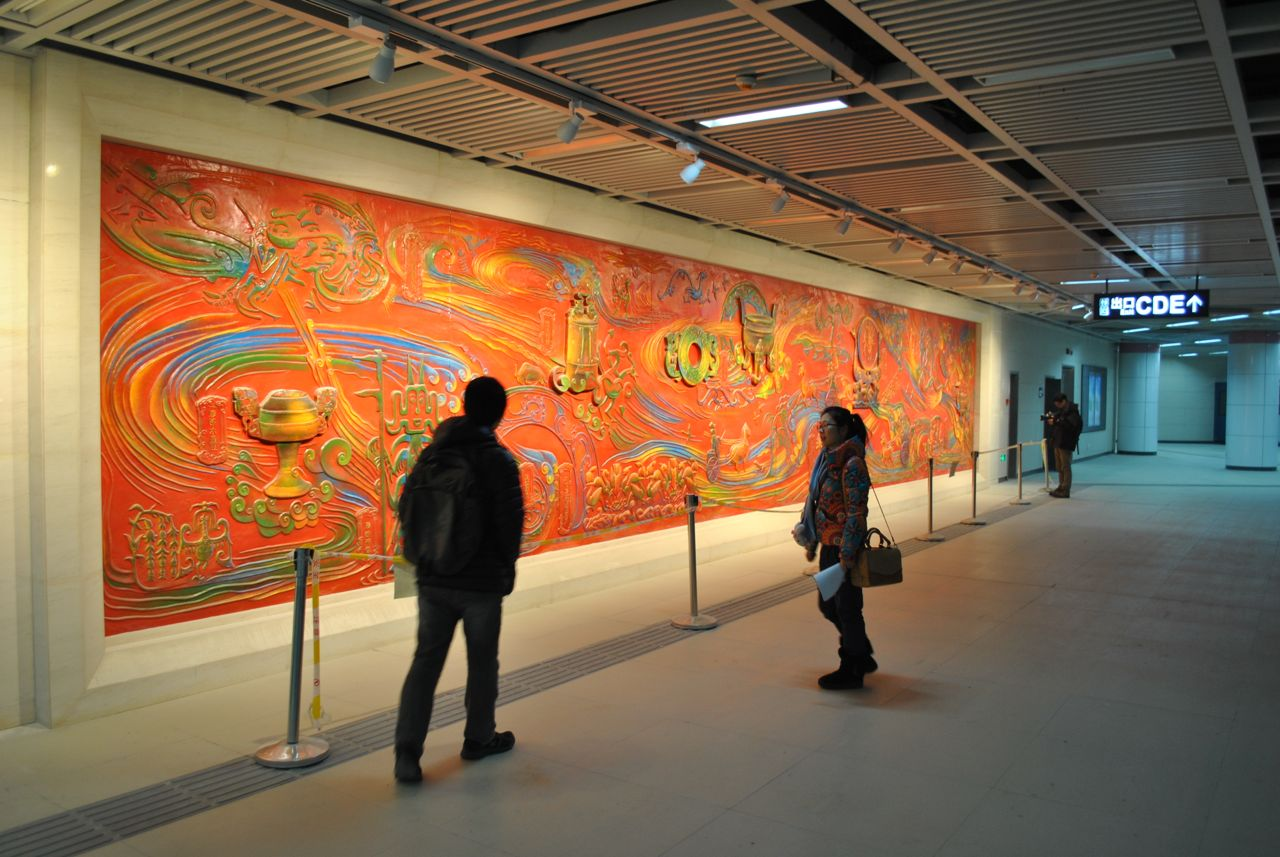
Art Wall

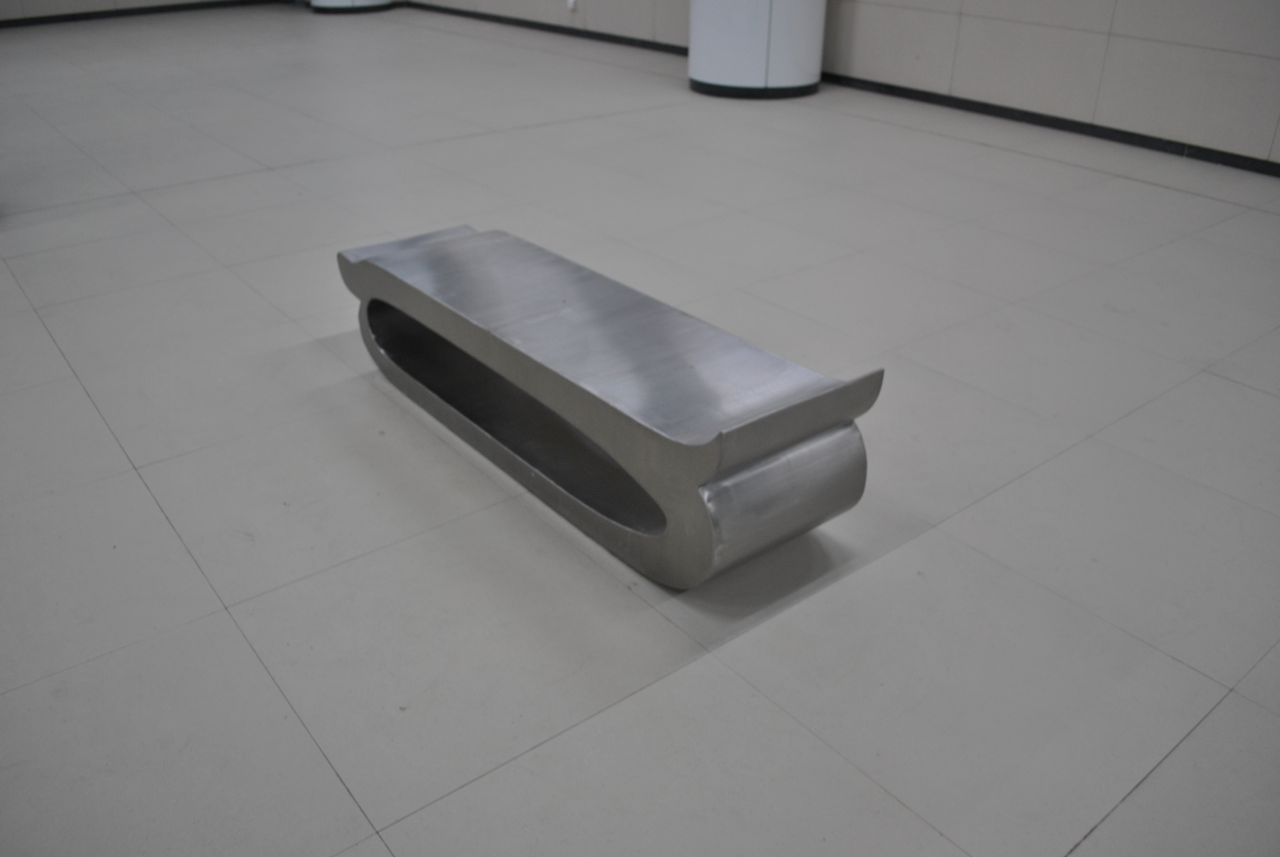
Chair

=== Entrance ===
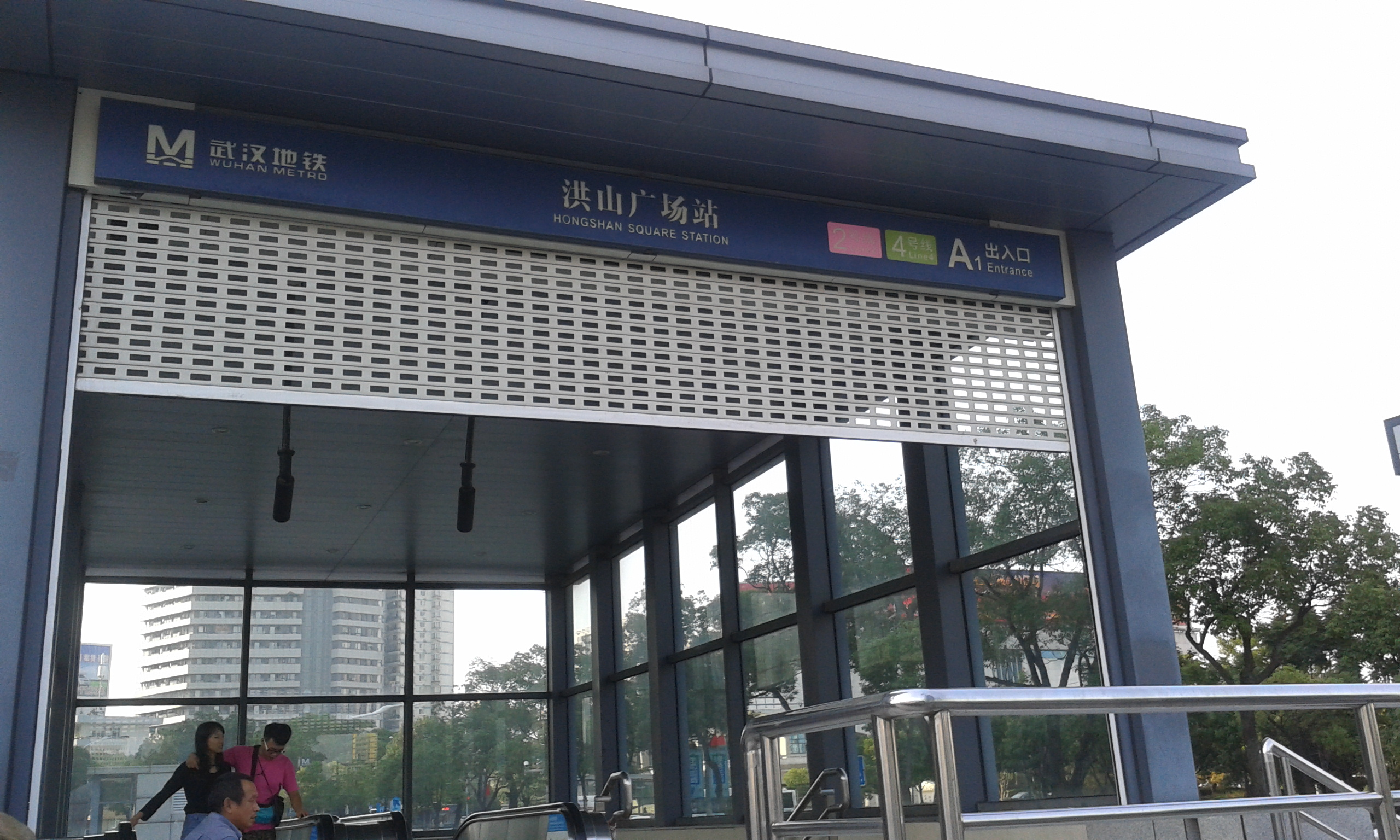
Entrance A1

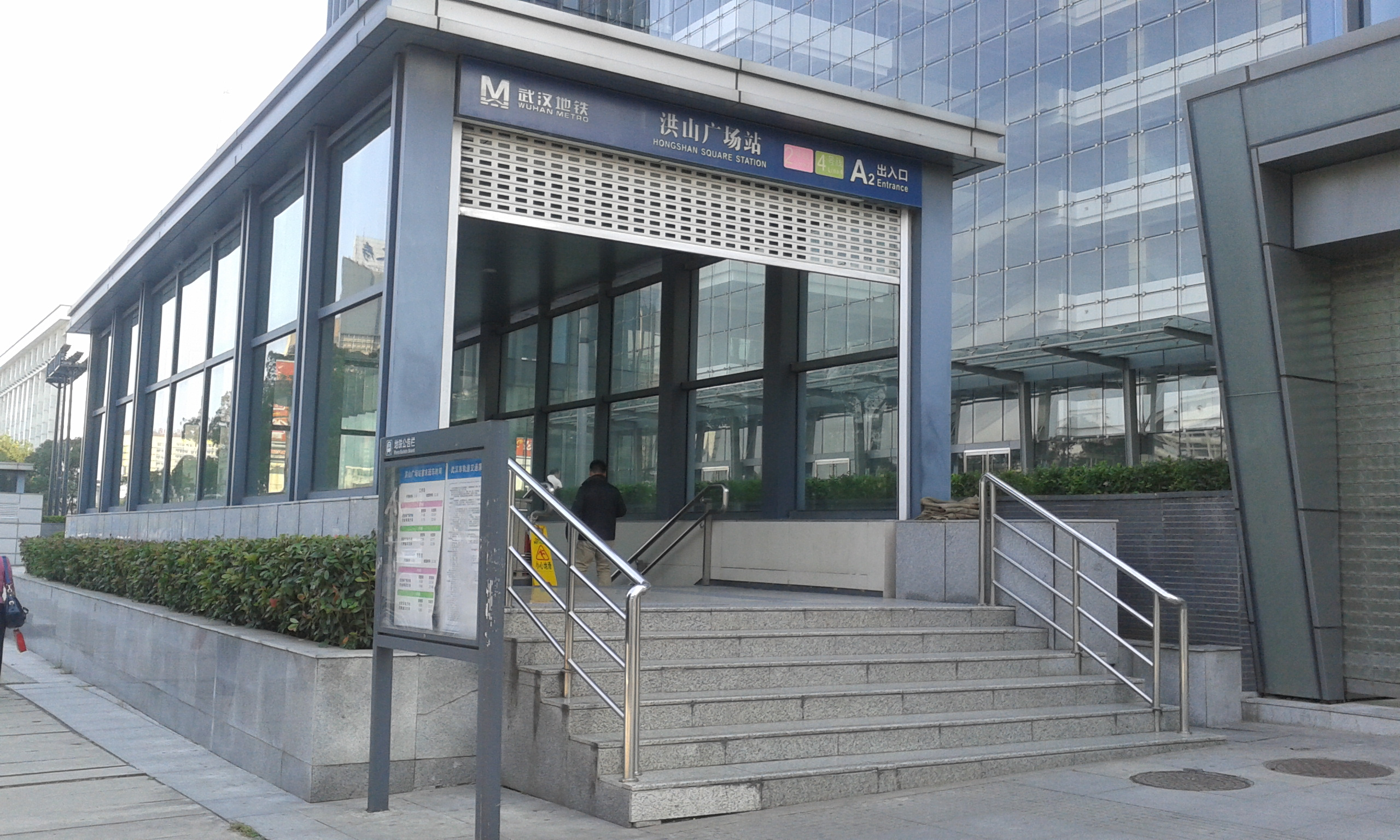
Entrance A2

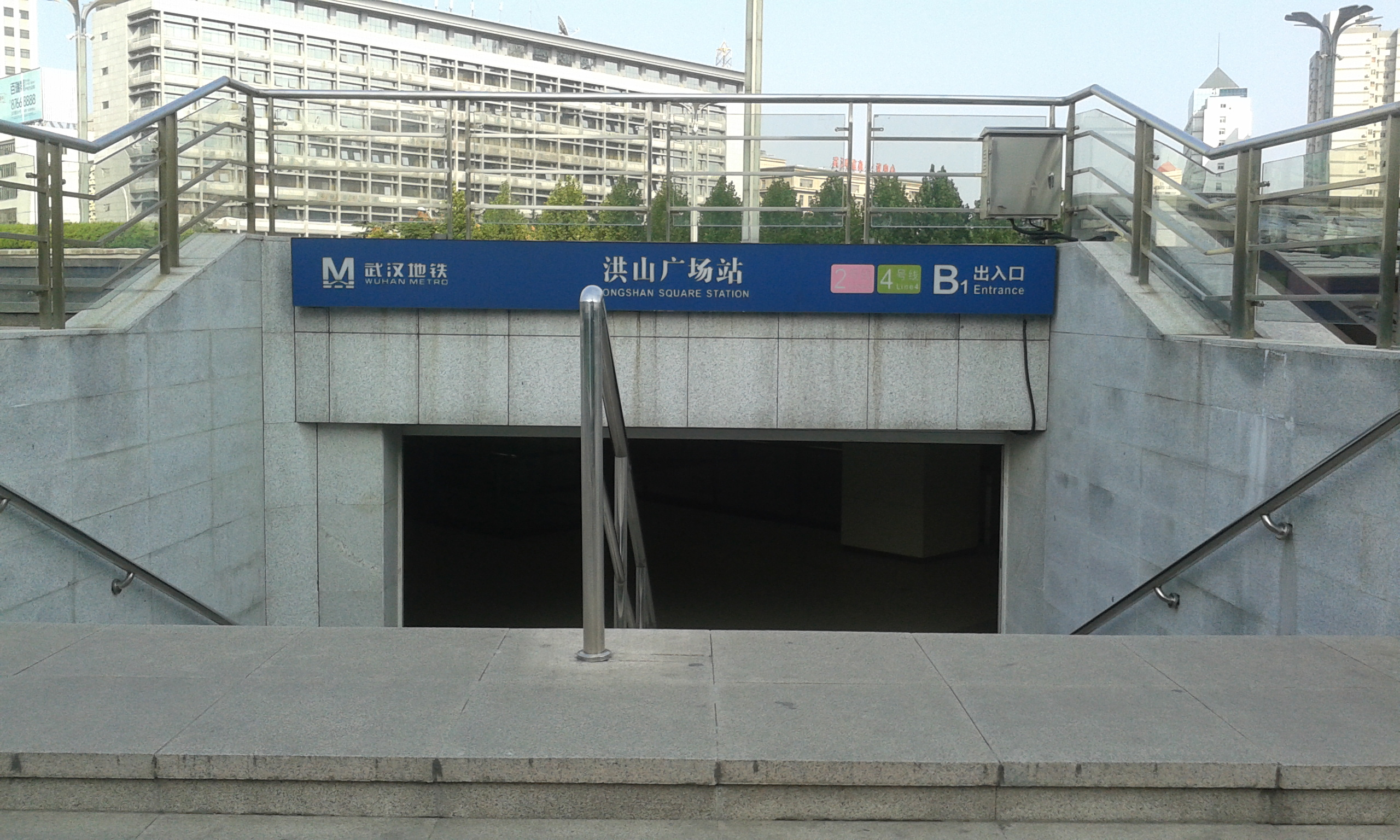
Entrance B1

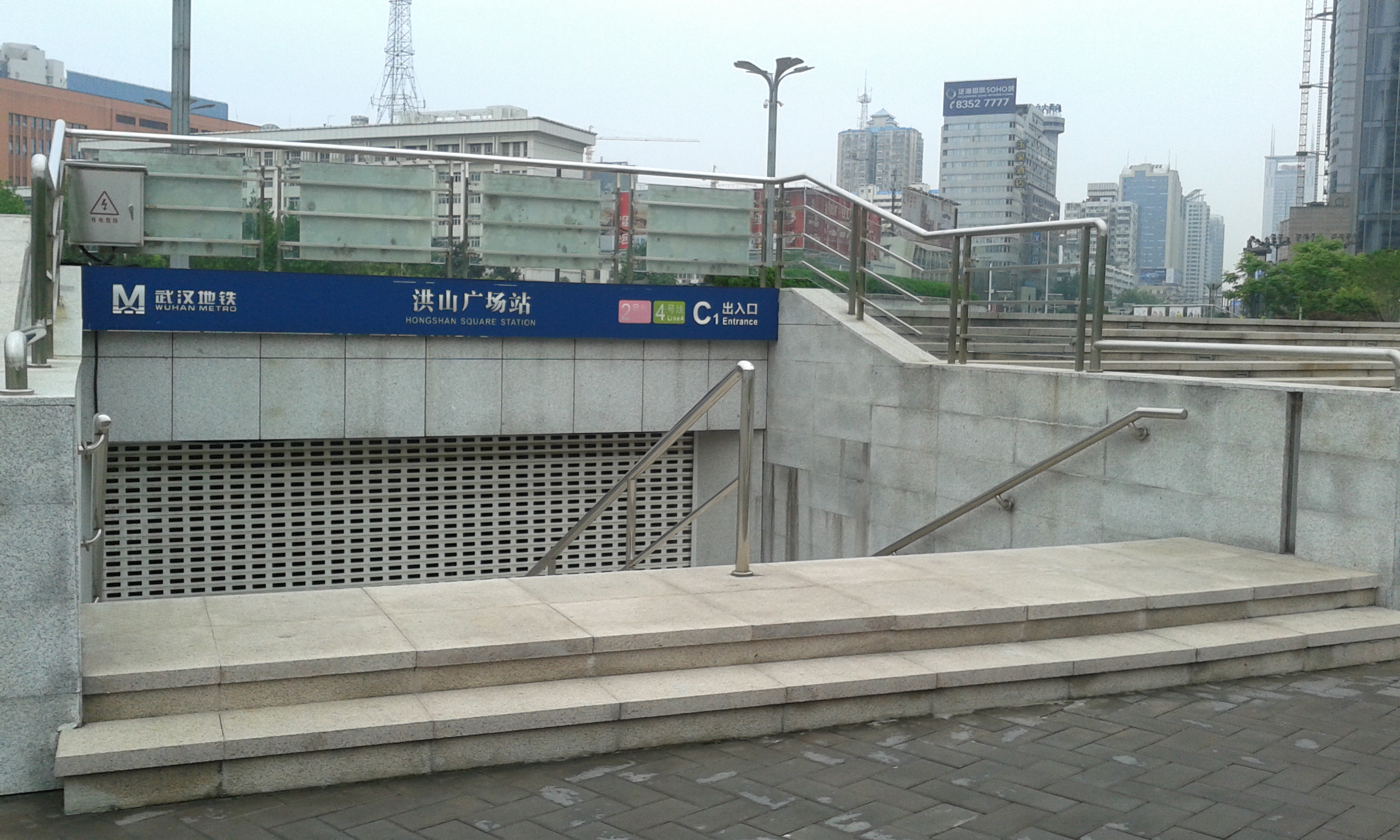
Entrance C1 (not open)

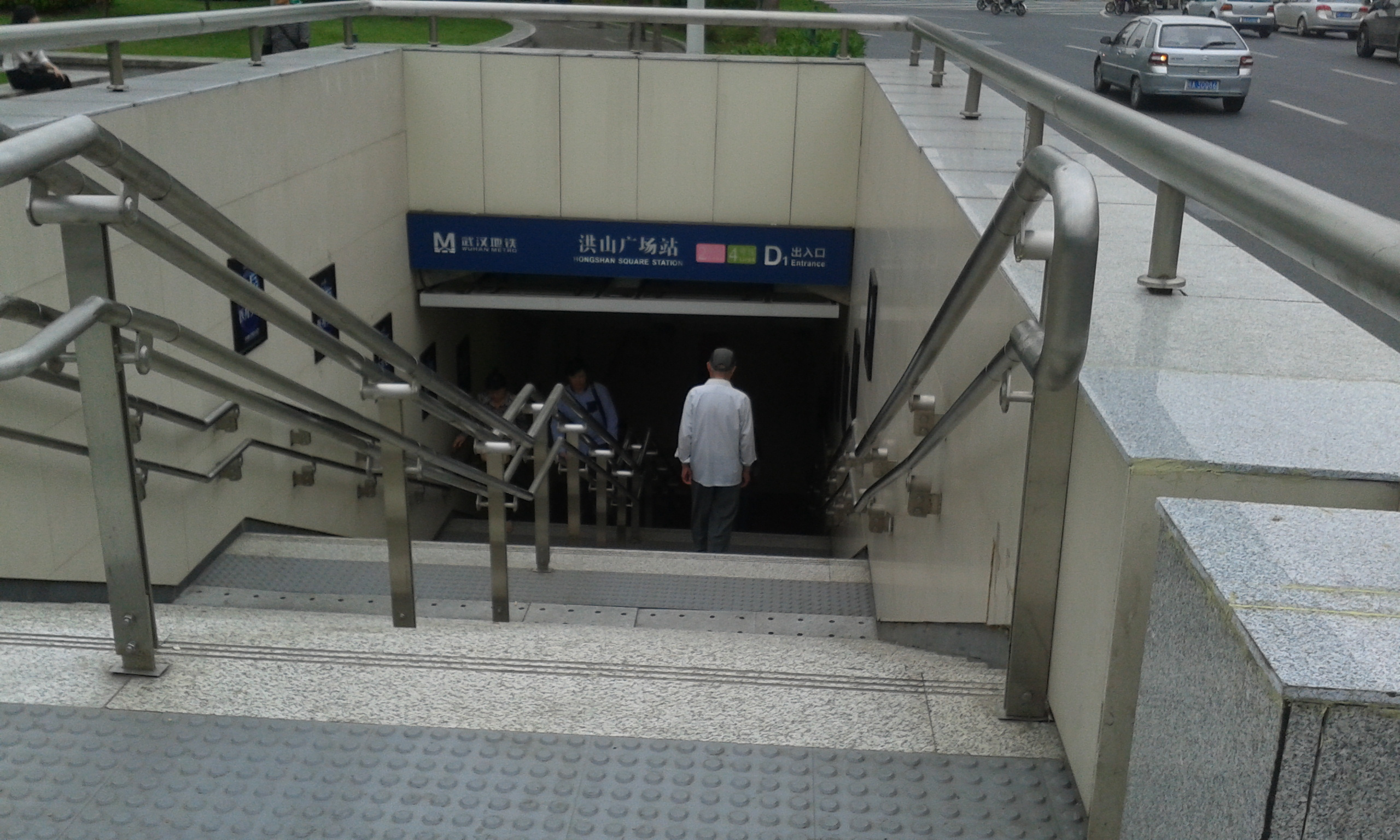
Entrance D1

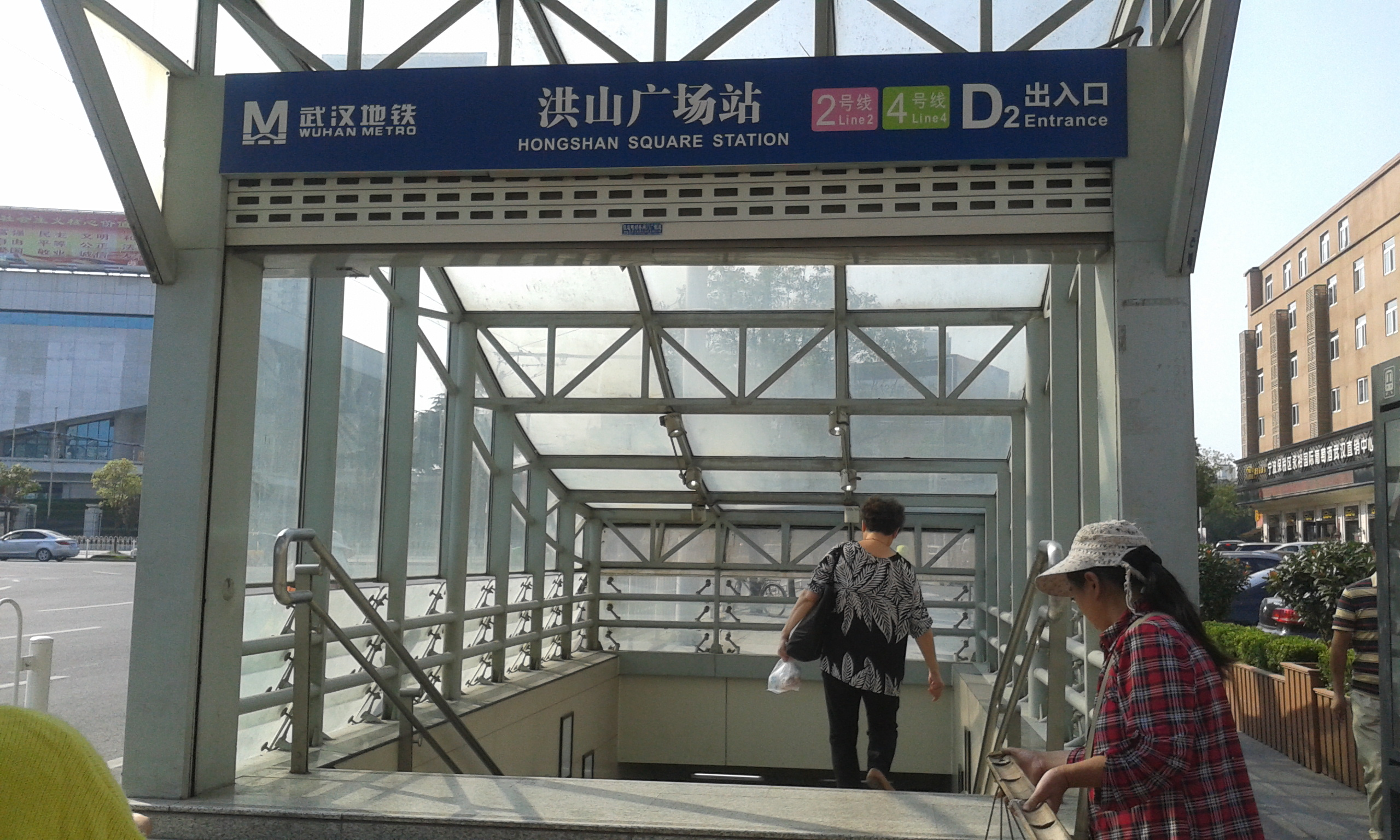
Entrance D2

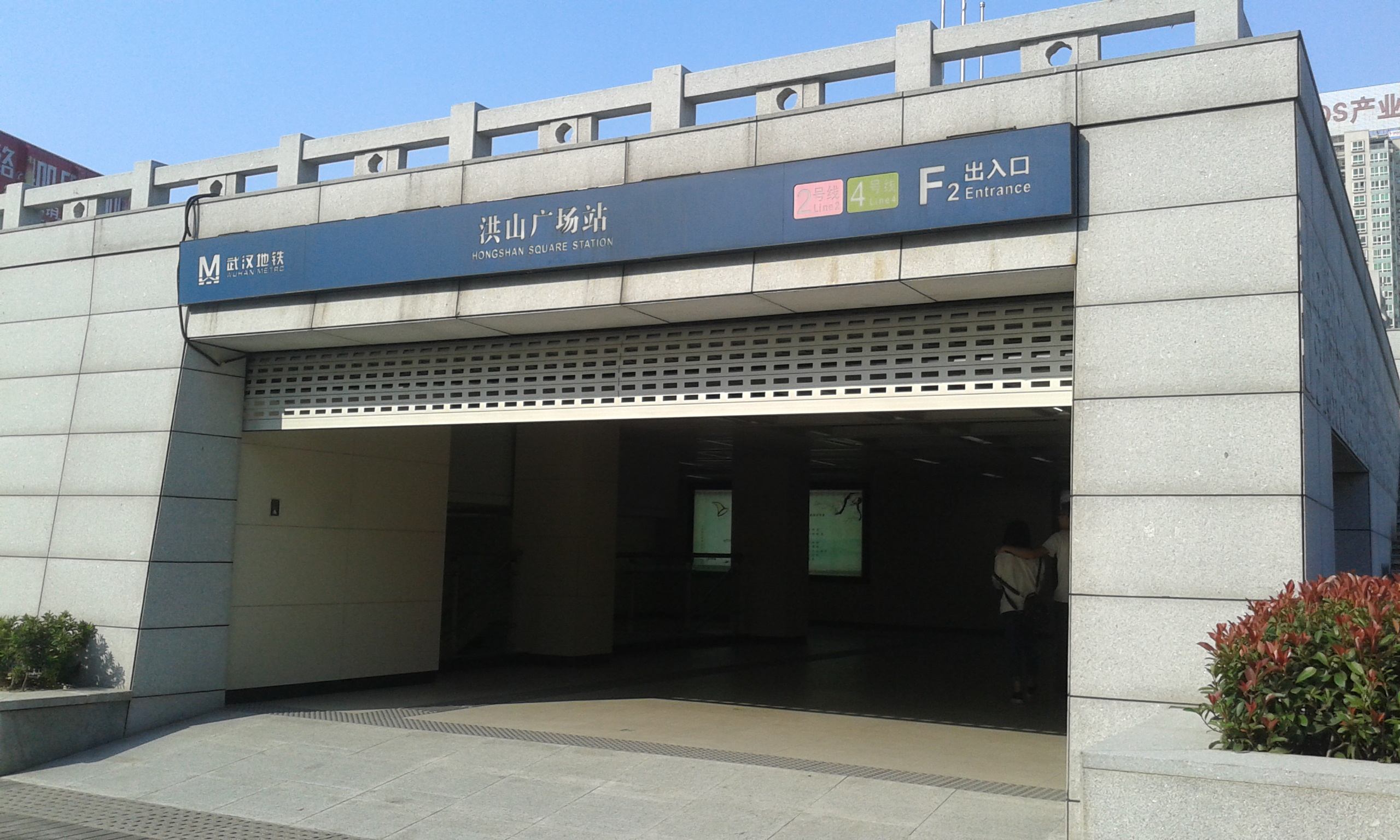
Entrance F2

== Paired cross-platform transfer ==
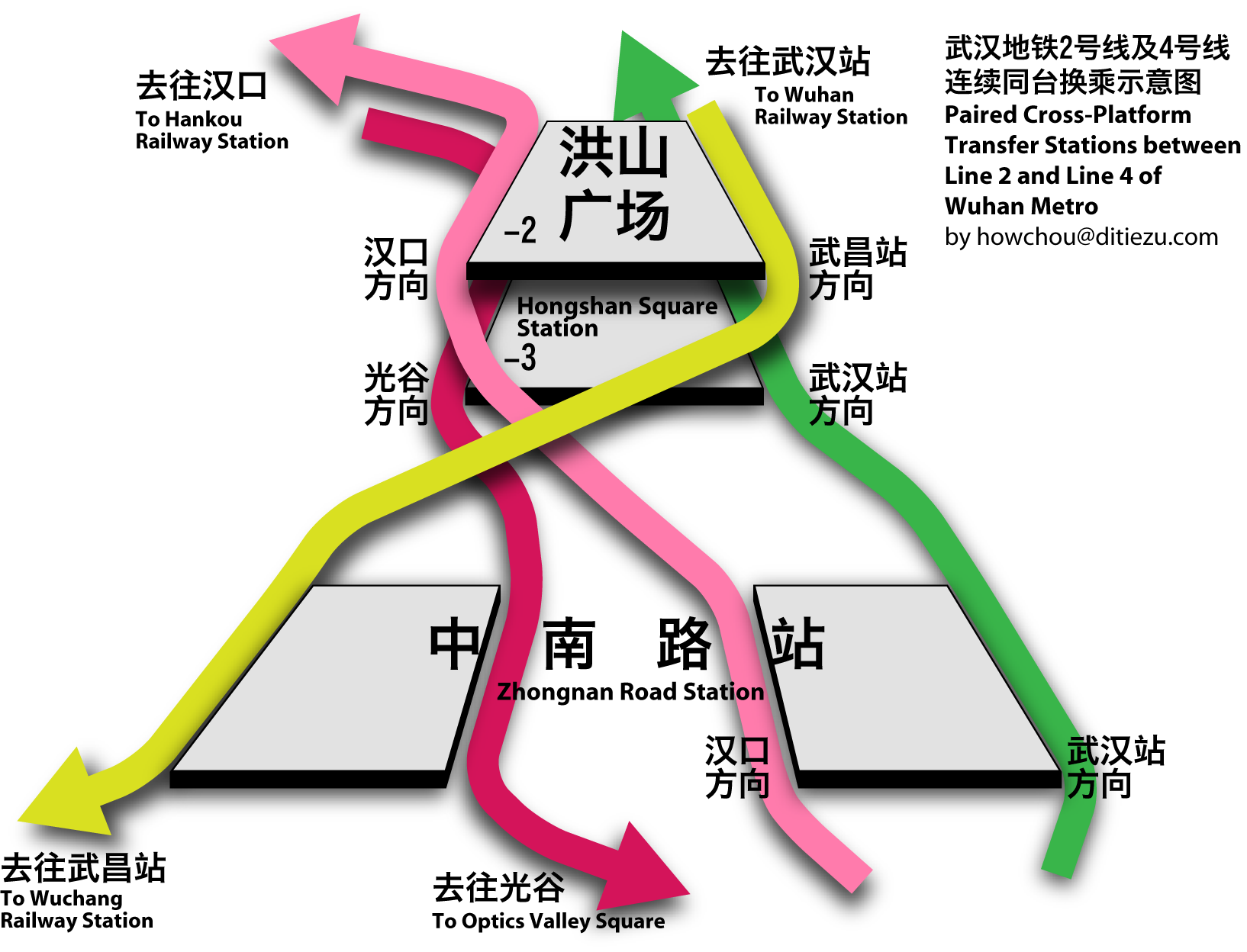
3D map

2D map

Hongshan Square station offers paired cross-platform interchange for passengers riding between 4 directions of the two lines. The configuration for the two stations is similar to that of Mong Kok and Prince Edward stations in Hong Kong's Mass Transit Railway.

Those who going to Wuhan railway station, can transfer at Hongshan Square Station by crossing the platform, and vice versa.
