= Wuchang railway station =

Railway station in Wuhan, China

Wuchang 武昌
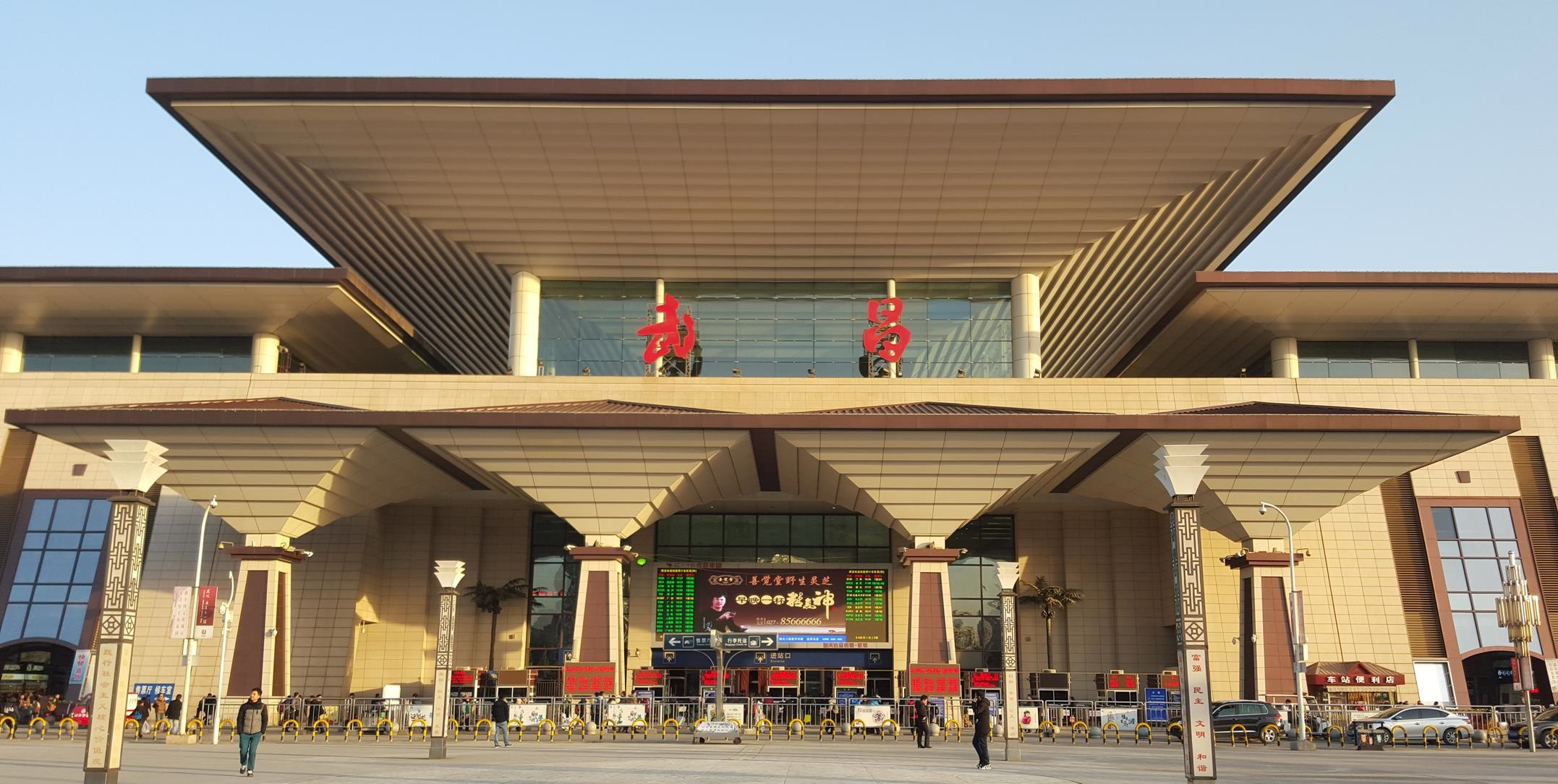
- New Wuchang railway station complex

General information
- Location: Zhongshan Road, Wuchang District, Wuhan, Hubei; China
- Coordinates: 30°31′43″N 114°19′4″E
- Operated by: China Railway Wuhan Group; China Railway
- Lines: Wuhan–Xianning intercity railway; Beijing–Guangzhou railway; Wuhan–Jiujiang railway; Hankou–Danjiangkou railway
- Platforms: 6
- Connections: Bus terminal

Other information
- Station code: TMIS code: 21077; Telegraph code: WCN; Pinyin code: WCH
- Classification: Top Class station

History
- Opened: 1916; 110 years ago (China Railway); 28 December 2013; 12 years ago (Wuhan Metro Line 4); 1 October 2018; 7 years ago (Wuhan Metro Line 7); 28 March 2020; 6 years ago (resume to operation, arrival only); 5 April 2020; 6 years ago (resume to operation)
Services
Preceding station	China Railway High-speed	Following station
Terminus	Wuhan–Xianning intercity railway	Nanhu East towards Xianning South
Preceding station	China Railway	Following station
Hanyang towards Beijing or Beijing West	Beijing–Guangzhou railway	Yujiawan towards Guangzhou
Terminus	Wuhan–Jiujiang railway	Wuchang East towards Lushan
Terminus	Hankou–Danjiangkou railway	Hanyang towards Danjiang
Zhengzhou towards Beijing West	Beijing–Nanning–Hanoi	Changsha towards Gia Lâm
Location

Wuchang railway station is a major railway station on the Beijing–Guangzhou railway, the Wuhan–Jiujiang railway and the Hankou–Danjiangkou railway, located on the east side of Zhongshan Road in Wuchang District, Wuhan, Hubei, China.

Founded as the Tongxiangmen railway station (通湘门站) in 1916, the station was moved several times and settled in the current location in 1957. It is the largest transportation center in Wuhan with daily traffic of 77,000 passengers and 20,000 packages as of 2000, and a record of 80,000 passengers per day during the Chunyun period as of 2008.

== Gallery ==
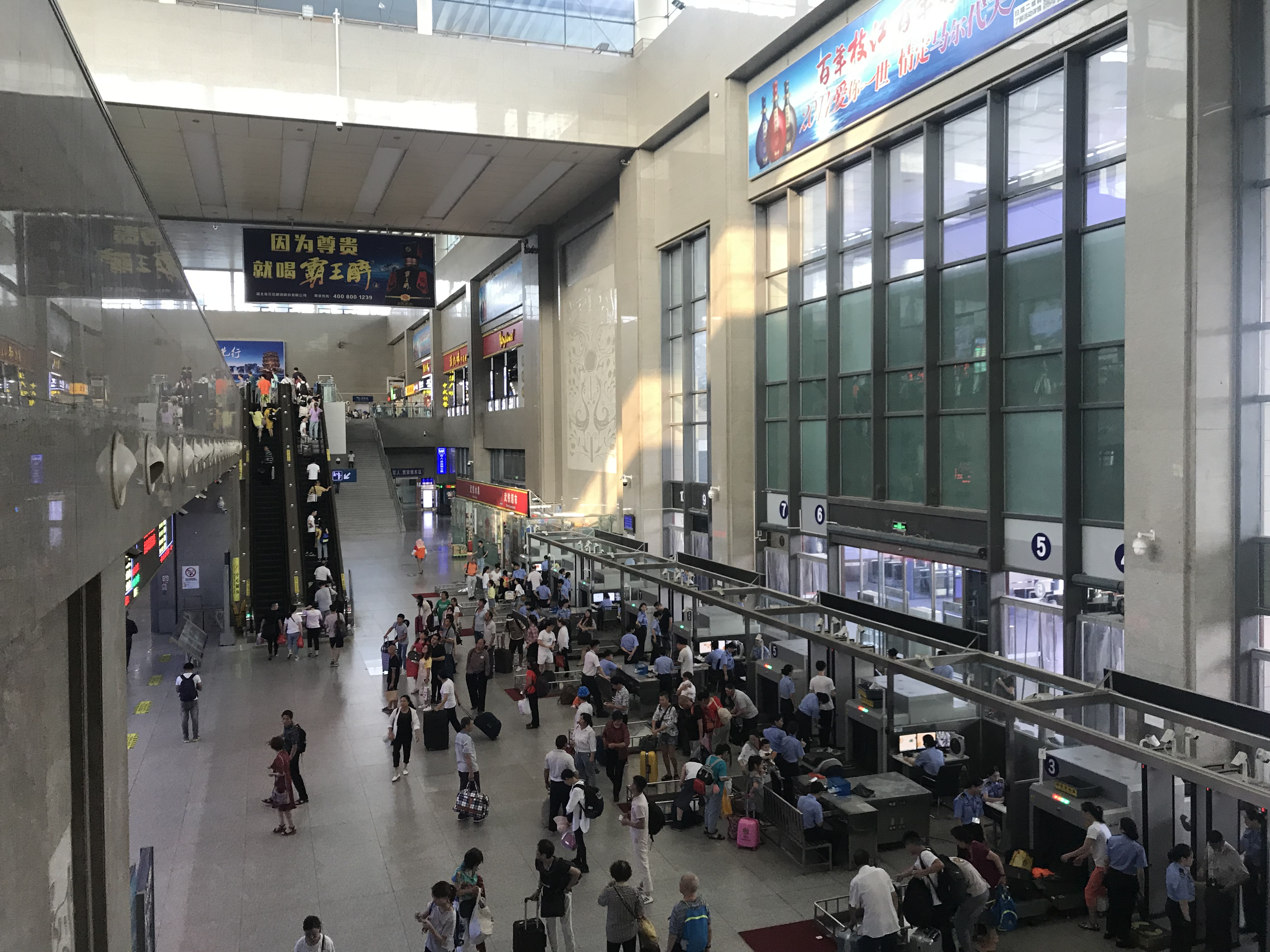
Main entrance

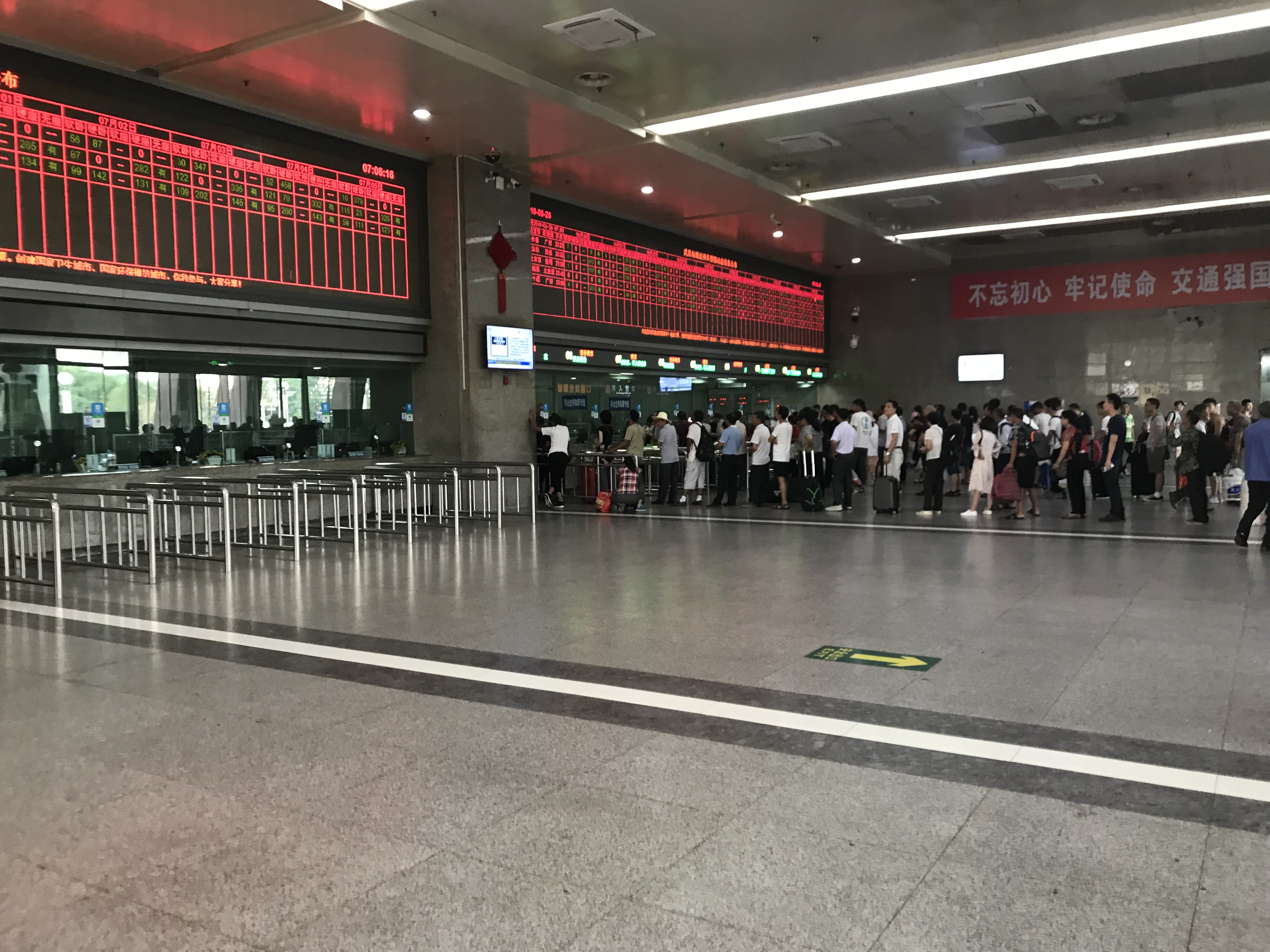
Ticket office

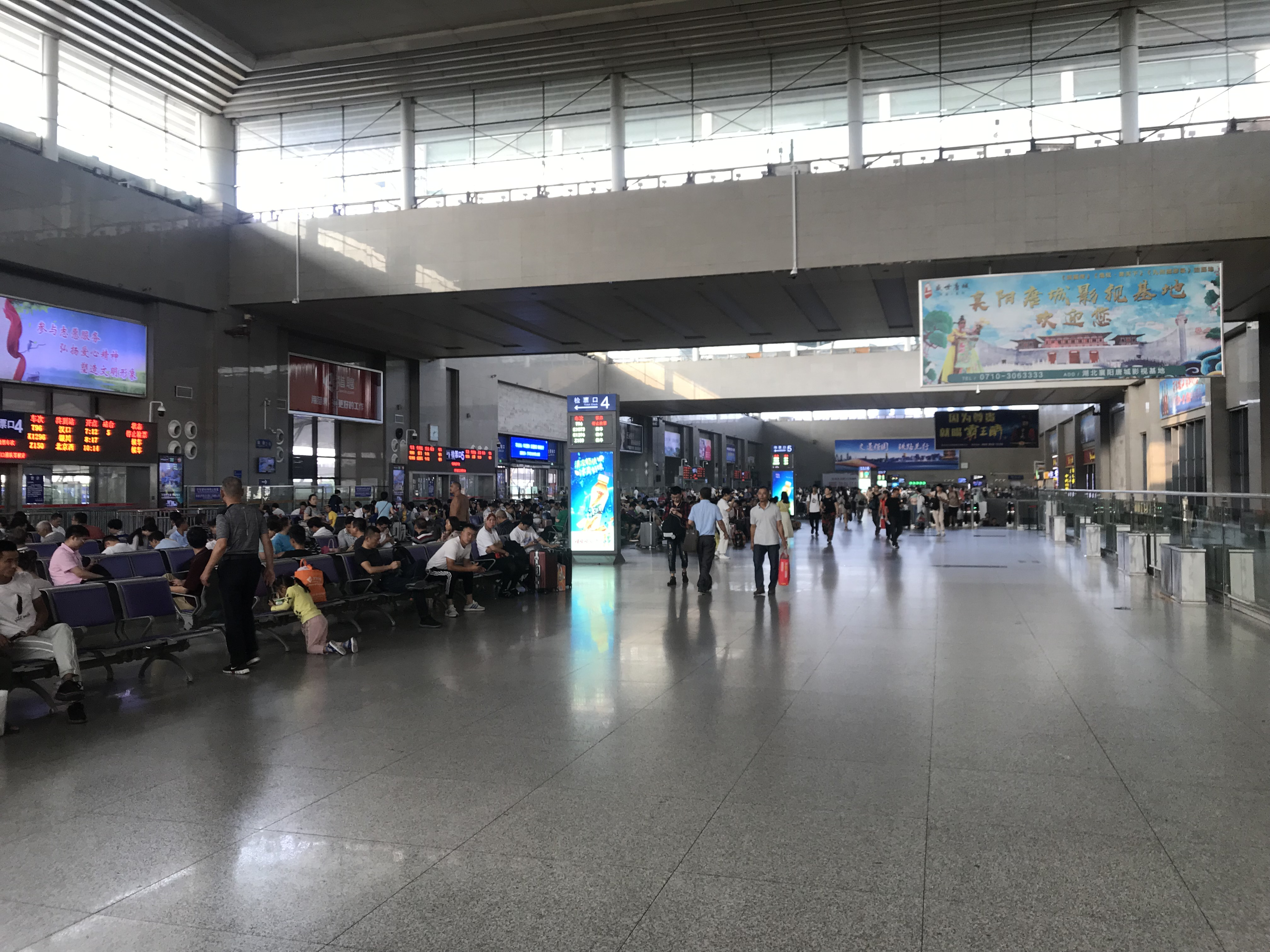
Arrivals lounge

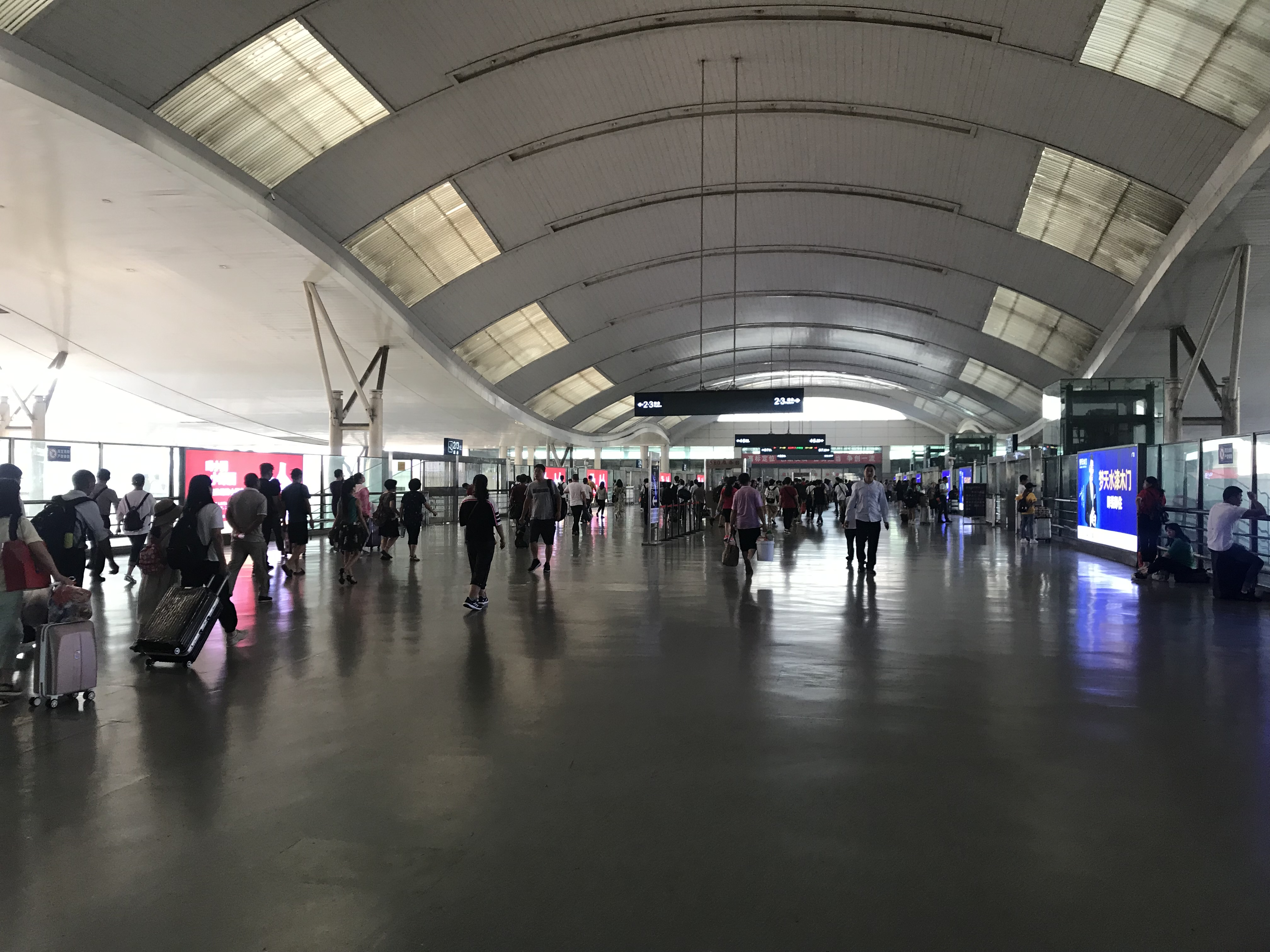
Flyover

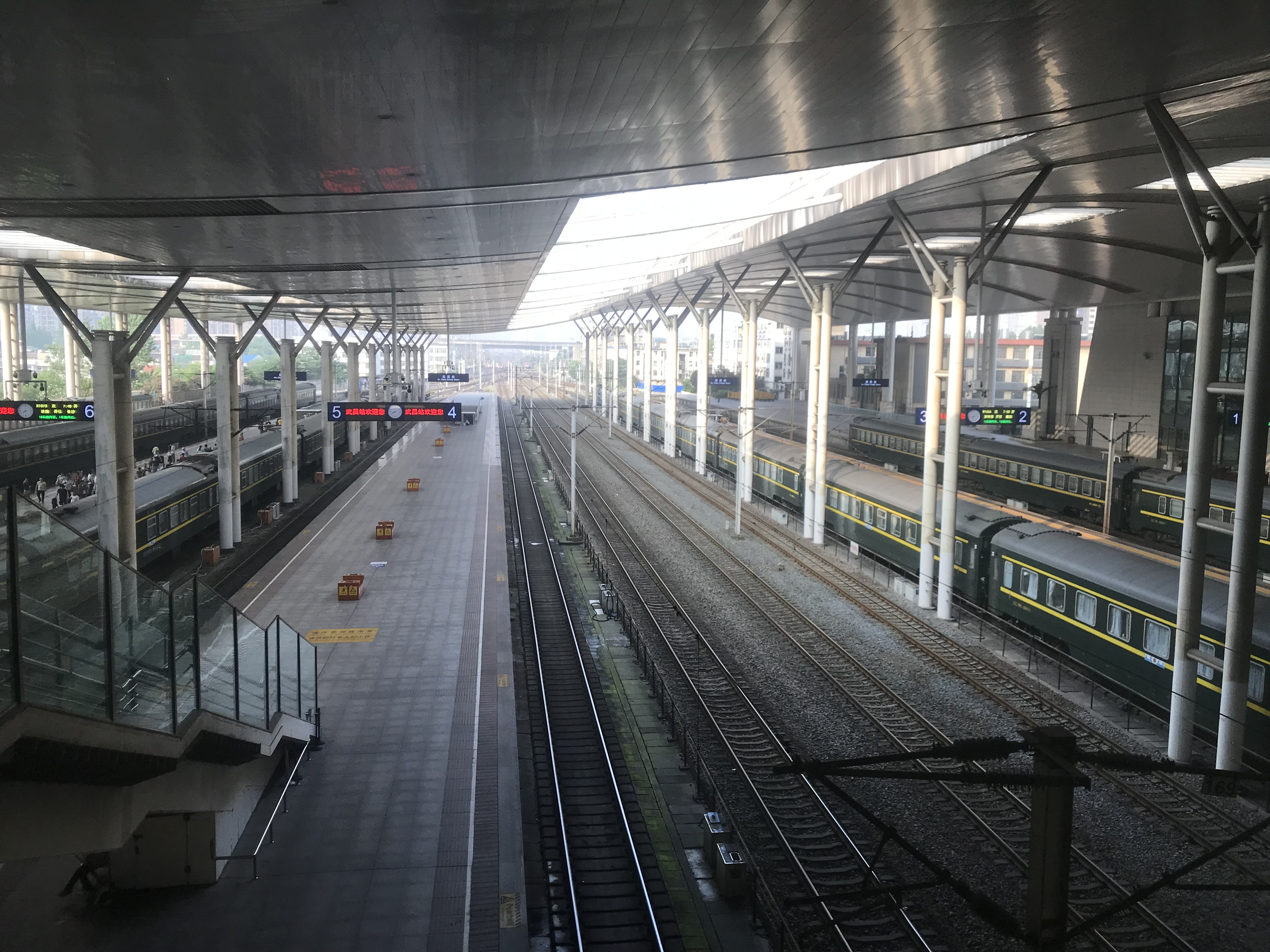
Platforms

== Wuhan Metro ==
Wuchang Railway Station 武昌火车站 4 7
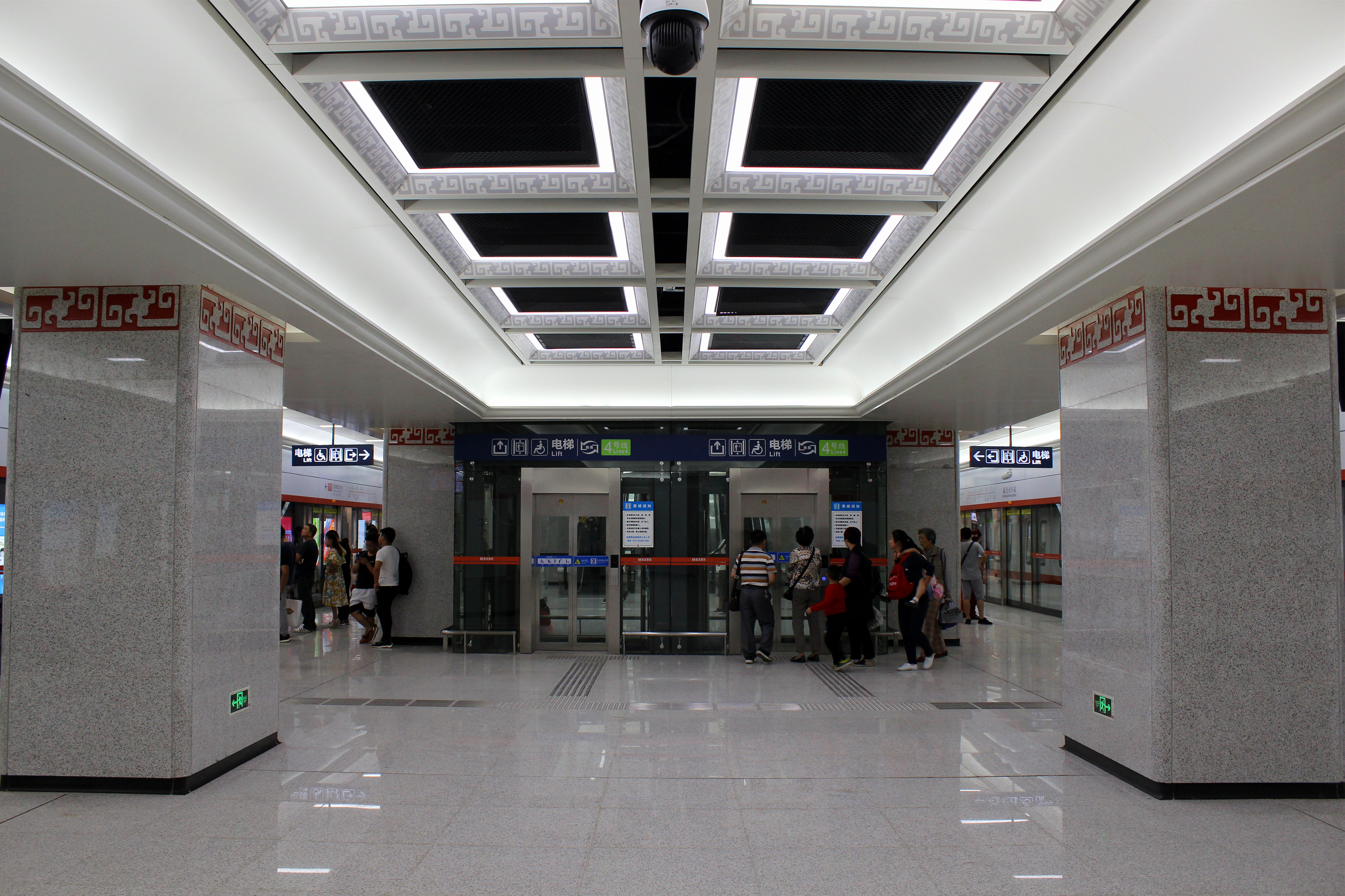

General information
- Location: Wuchang District, Wuhan, Hubei; China
- Operated by: Wuhan Metro Co., Ltd
- Lines: Line 4 Line 7
- Platforms: 4 (2 island platforms)

Construction
- Structure type: Underground

History
- Opened: December 28, 2013 (Line 4); October 1, 2018 (Line 7)

Services
Preceding station	Wuhan Metro	Following station
Shouyi Road towards Bailin	Line 4	Meiyuanxiaoqu towards Wuhan Railway Station
Xiaodongmen towards Huangpi Square	Line 7	Rui'an Street towards Qinglongshan Ditiexiaozhen
Location

Wuchang Railway Station (Chinese: 武昌火车站), is a transfer station of Line 4 and Line 7 of the Wuhan Metro. It entered revenue service on December 28, 2013. It is located in Wuchang District and it serves Wuchang railway station.

=== Station layout ===
G	Entrances and Exits	Exits A-H
B1	Concourse	Faregates, Station Agent
B2	Northbound	← Line 4 towards Bailin (Shouyi Road)
B2	Island platform, doors will open on the left
B2	Southbound	Line 4 towards Wuhan Railway Station (Meiyuanxiaoqu) →
B3	Northbound	← Line 7 towards Huangpi Square (Xiaodongmen)
B3	Island platform, doors will open on the left
B3	Southbound	Line 7 towards Qinglongshan Ditiexiaozhen (Ruian Street) →

=== Gallery ===
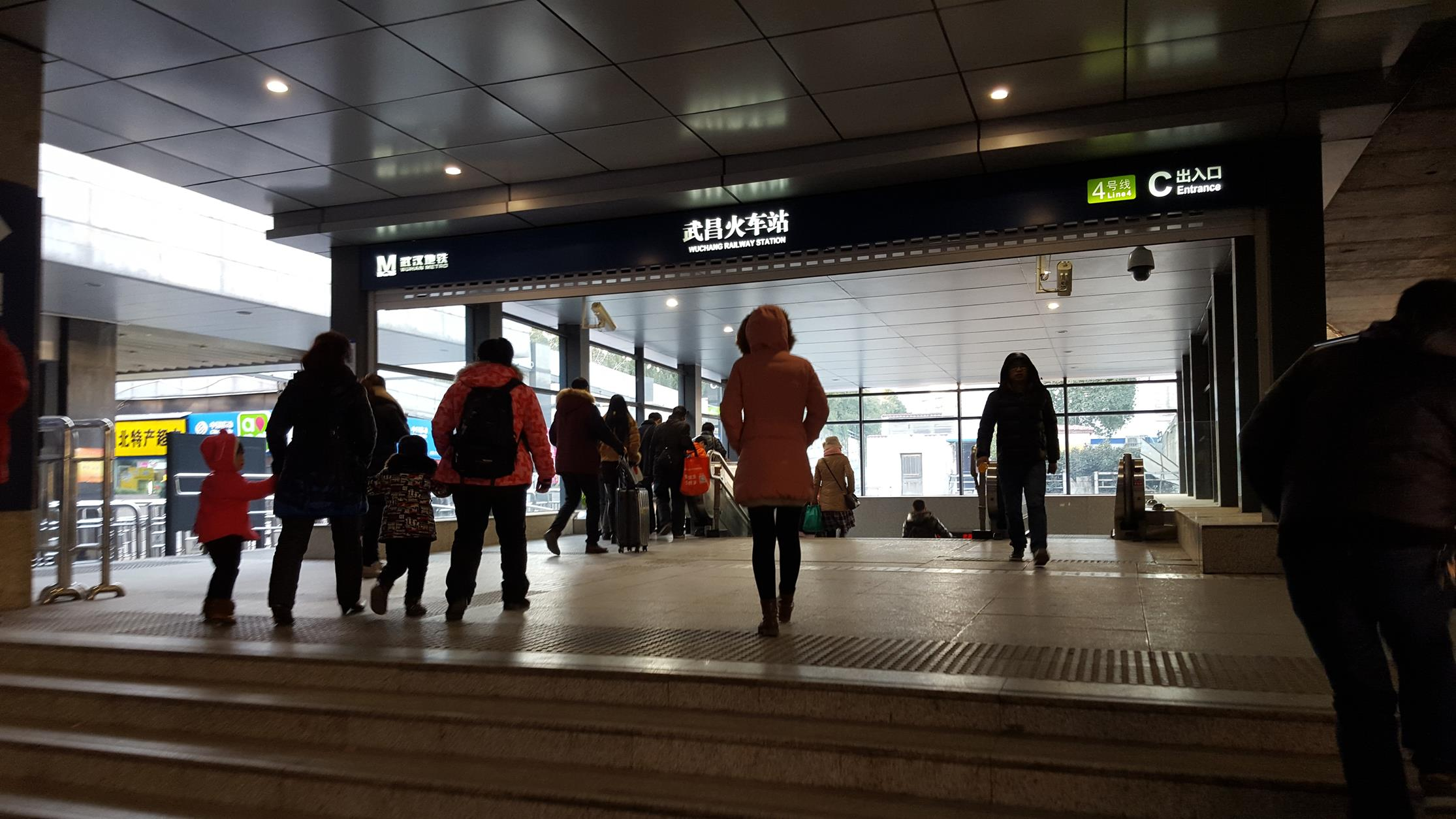
Entrance C

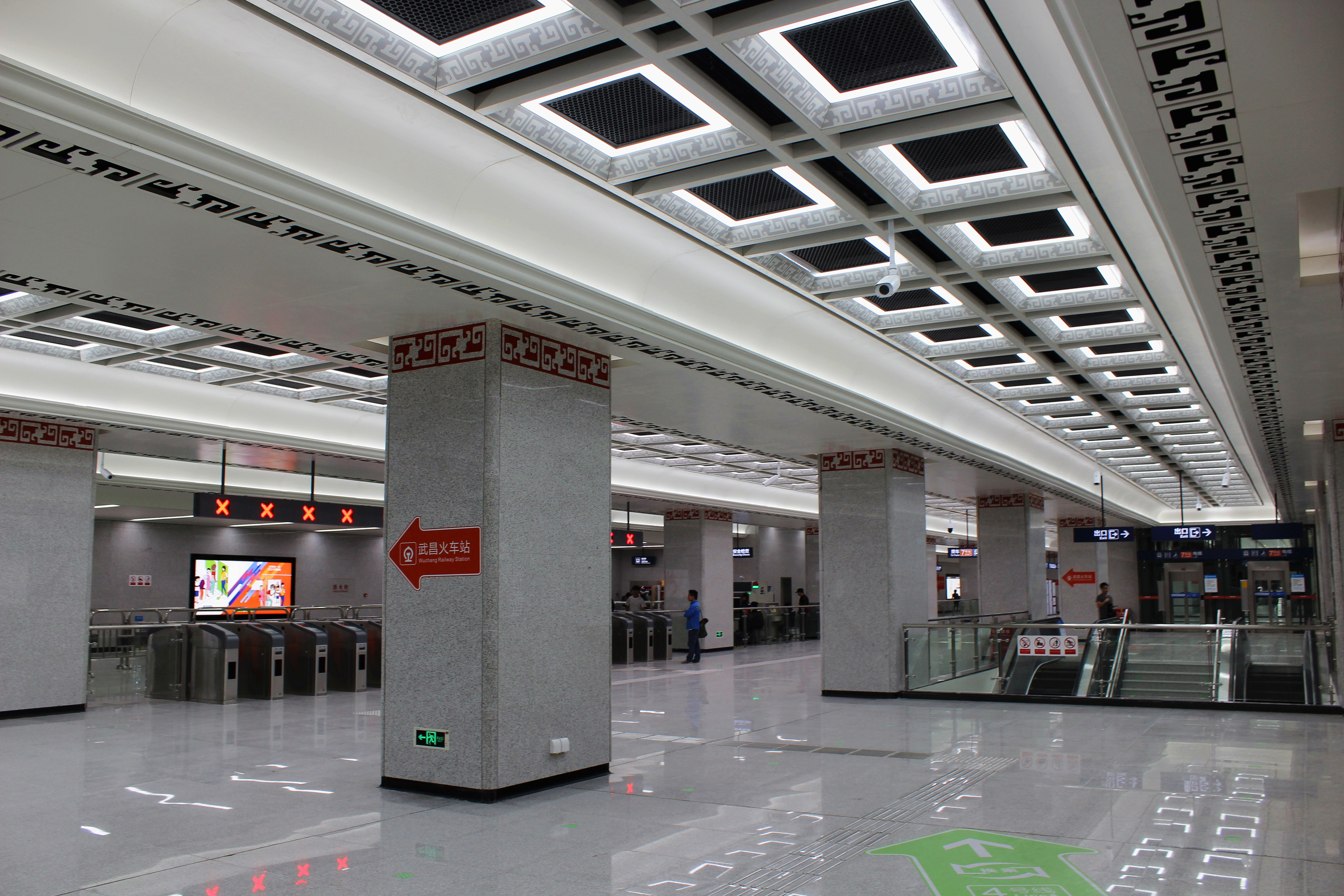
Concourse

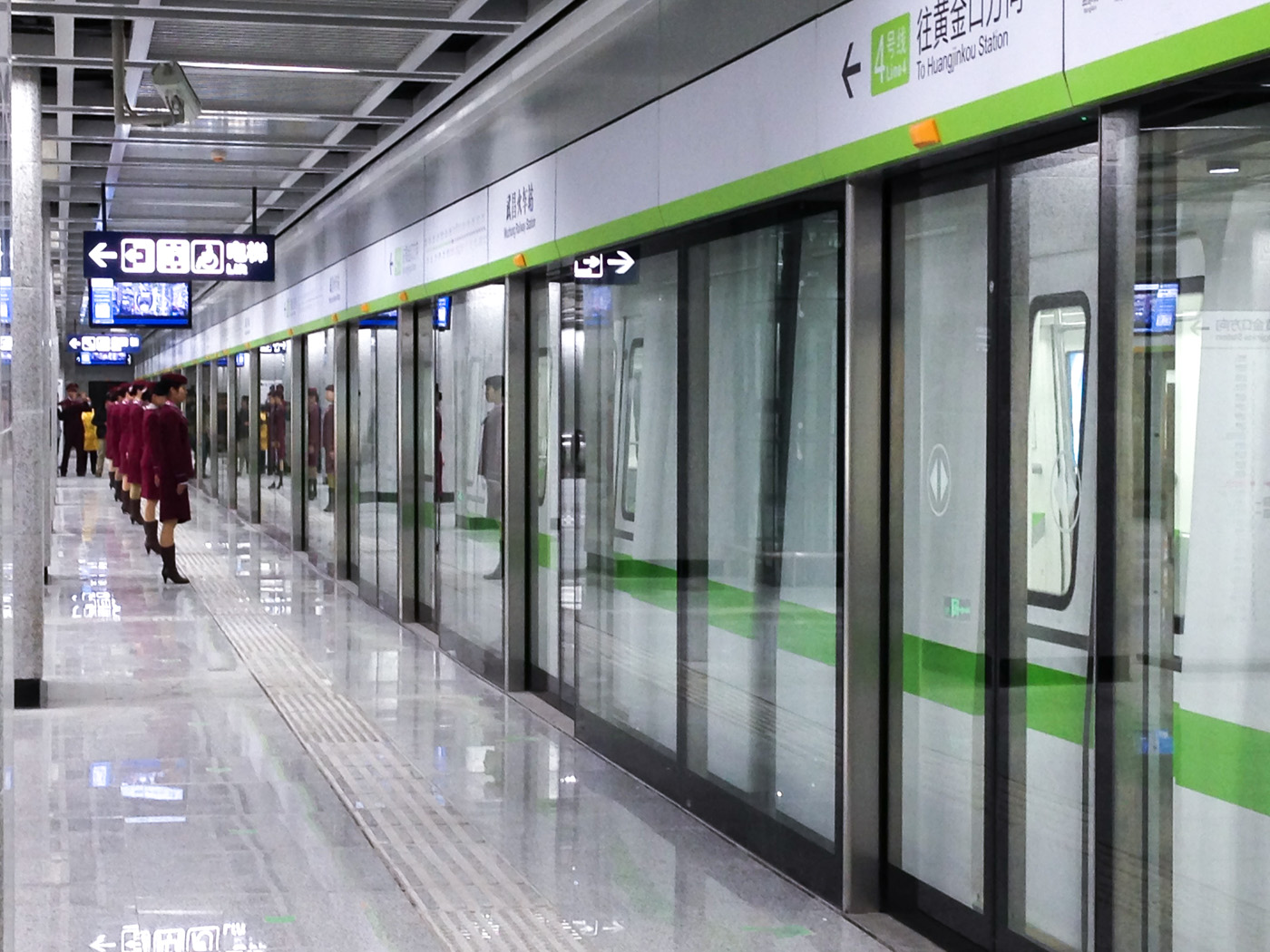
Line 4 platform

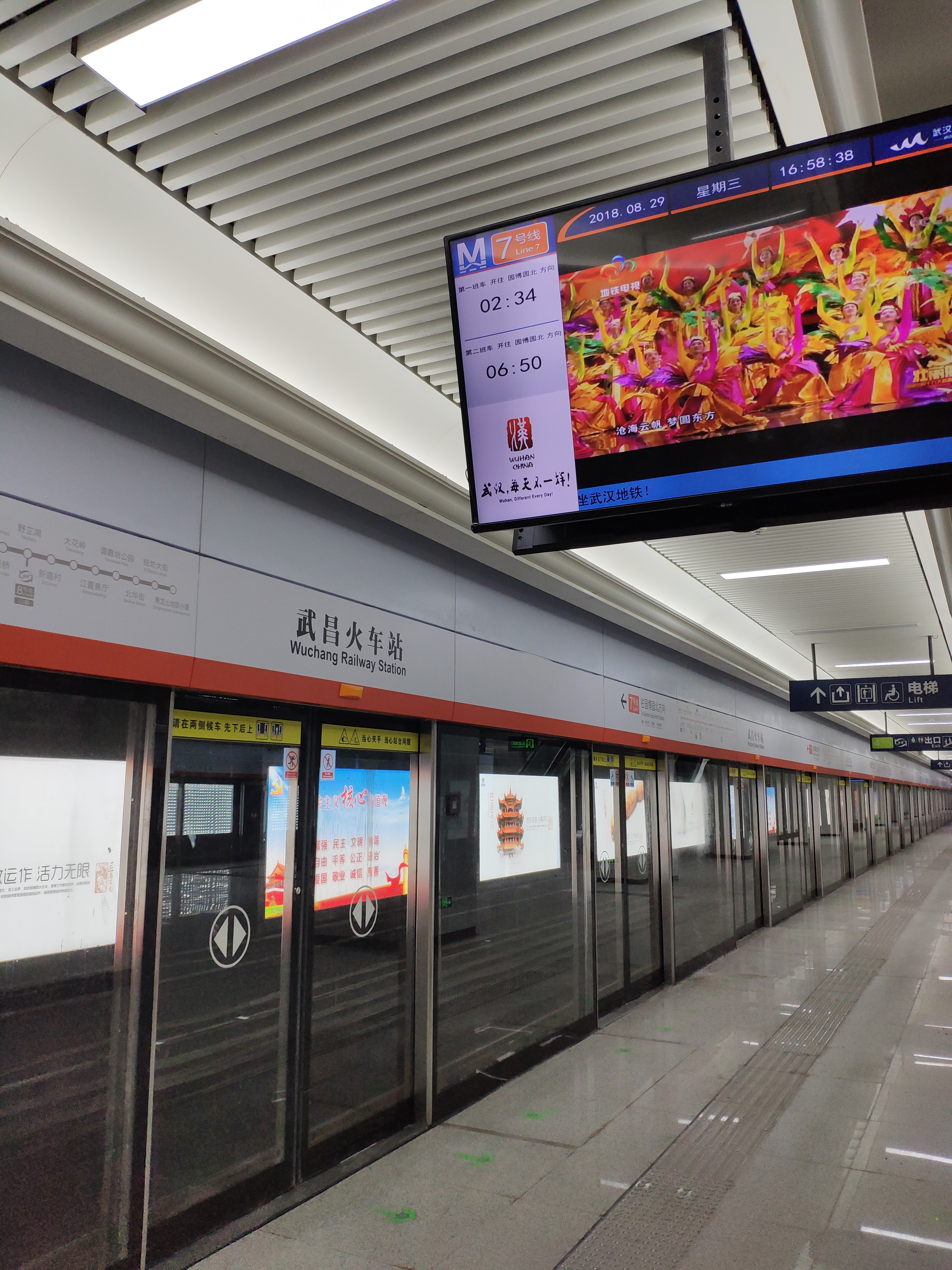
Line 7 platform

== Bus ==
Bus No. 10 and Special Line 561 run between this station and Hankou.

== See also ==
- Wuhan–Guangzhou high-speed railway (which serves Wuhan, rather than Wuchang)
