= Tanxinpei Park station =

Metro station in Wuhan, China

Tanxinpei Park 谭鑫培公园 metro
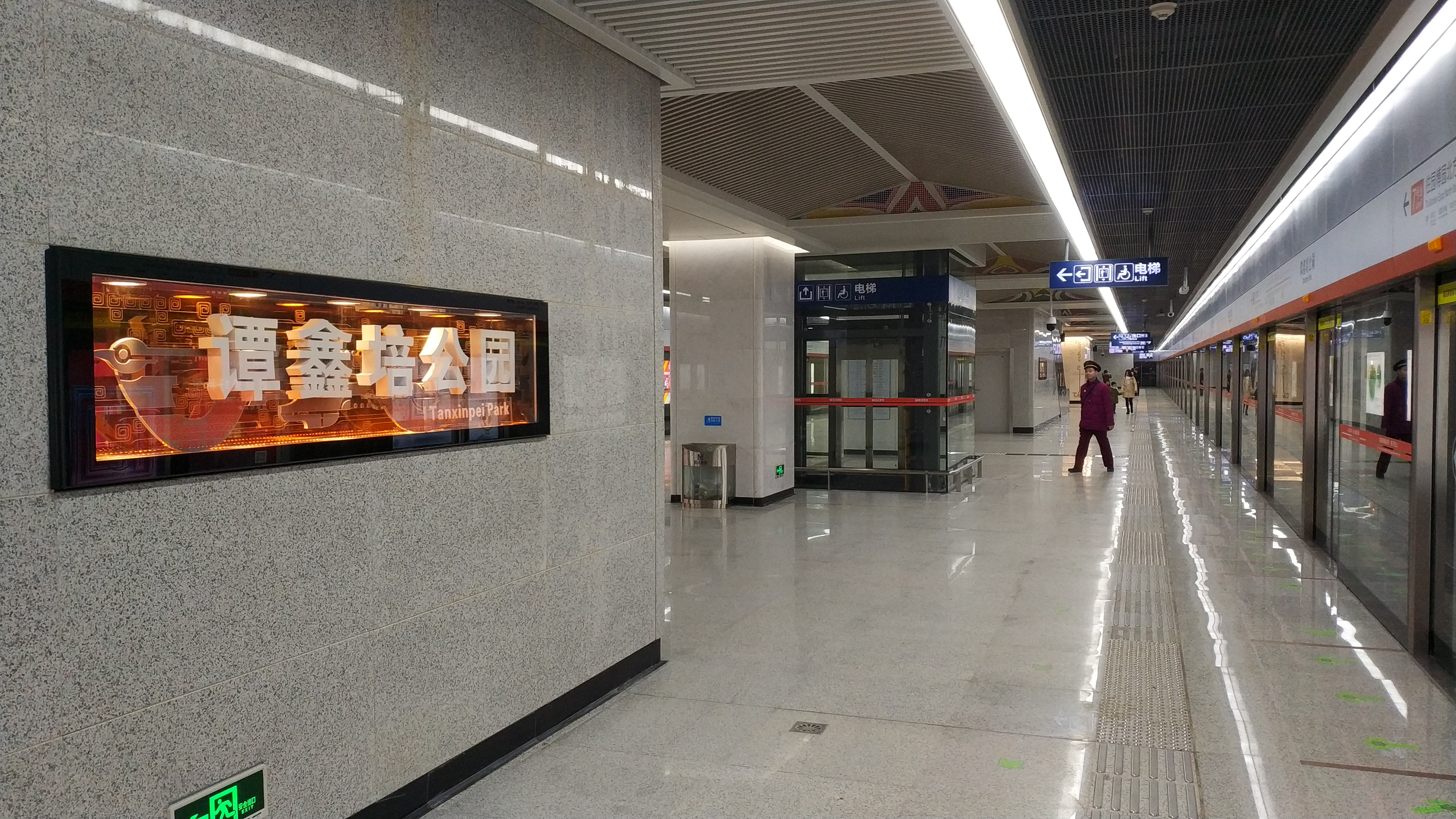

General information
- Location: Jiangxia District, Wuhan, Hubei; China
- Operated by: Wuhan Metro Co., Ltd
- Line: Line 7
- Platforms: 2 (1 island platform)

Construction
- Structure type: Underground

History
- Opened: December 28, 2018 (Line 7)

Services
Preceding station	Wuhan Metro	Following station
Jiangxiaketing towards Huangpi Square	Line 7	Beihua Street towards Qinglongshan Ditiexiaozhen
Location

Tanxinpei Park Station (Chinese: 谭鑫培公园站) is a station on Line 7 of the Wuhan Metro. It entered revenue service on December 28, 2018. It is located in Jiangxia District.

== Station layout ==
G	Entrances and Exits
B1	Concourse	Faregates, Station Agent
B2	Northbound	← Line 7 towards Huangpi Square (Jiangxiaketing)
B2	Island platform, doors will open on the left
B2	Southbound	Line 7 towards Qinglongshan Ditiexiaozhen (Beihua Street) →
