= Wuhan Business District station =

Metro station in Wuhan, China

Wuhan Business District 武汉商务区 metro
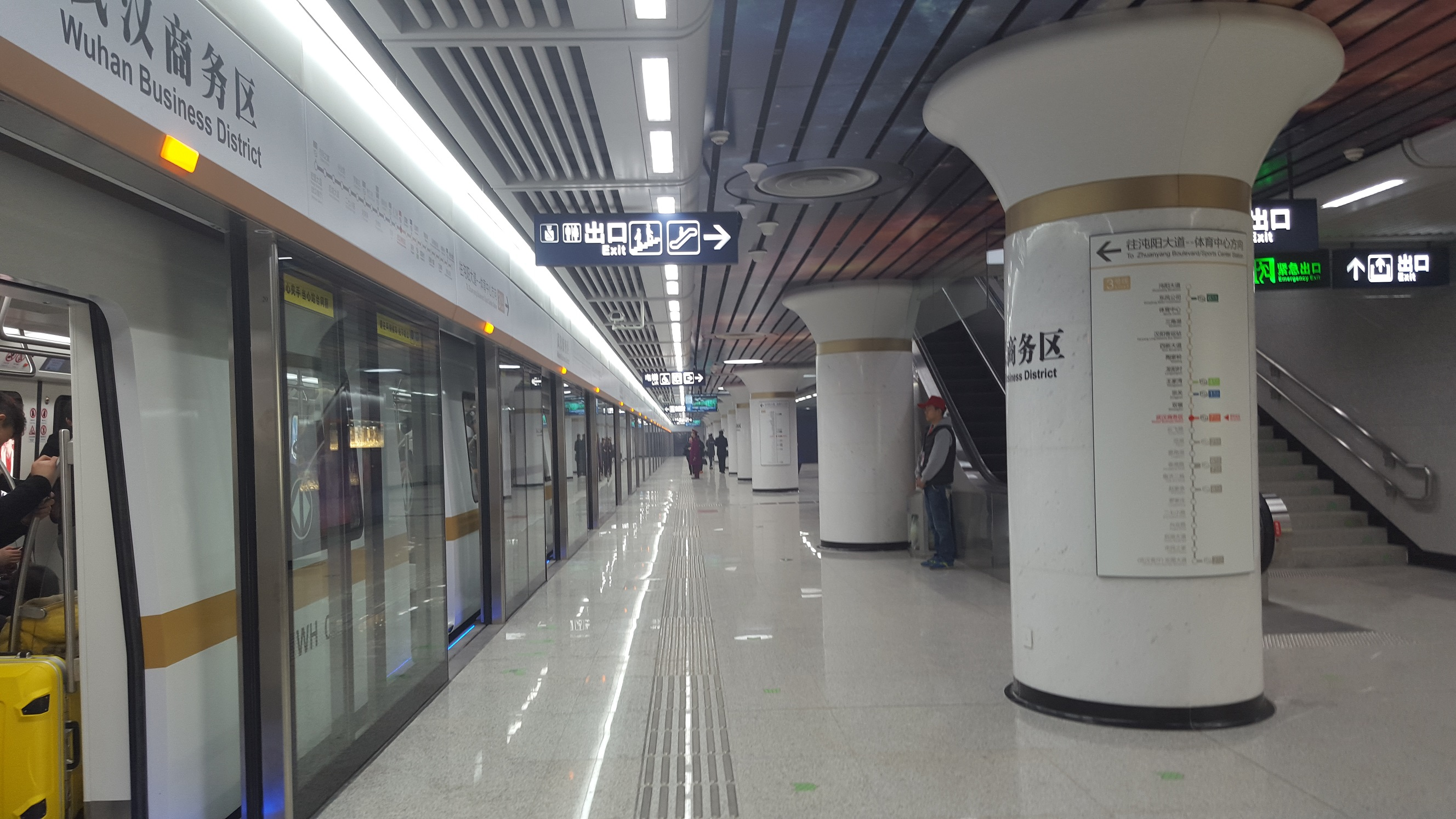
- Line 3 platform

General information
- Location: Jianghan District, Wuhan, Hubei; China
- Operator: Wuhan Metro Co., Ltd
- Lines: Line 3; Line 7; Line 10 (under planning)
- Platforms: 4 (2 side platforms, 1 island platform)

Construction
- Structure type: Underground

History
- Opened: December 28, 2015 (Line 3); October 1, 2018 (Line 7)

Services
Preceding station	Wuhan Metro	Following station
Yunfei Road towards Hongtu Boulevard	Line 3	Shuangdun towards Zhuanyang Boulevard
Changmatou towards Huangpi Square	Line 7	Wangjiadun East towards Qinglongshan Ditiexiaozhen
Location

Wuhan Business District Station (Chinese: 武汉商务区站) is a station of Line 3 and Line 7 of Wuhan Metro. It entered revenue service on December 28, 2015. It is located in Jianghan District. This station is an interchange station of Line 3, Line 7 and the under planning Line 10. It is near the Wuhan CBD.

== Station layout ==
G	Entrances and Exits	Exits A-H, J-N, P-U, W
B1	Concourse	Faregates, Station Agent
B2		Transfer Corridor
B2	Side platform, doors will open on the right
B2	Northbound	← Line 3 towards Hongtu Boulevard (Yunfei Road)
B2	Southbound	Line 3 towards Zhuanyang Boulevard (Shuangdun) →
B2	Side platform, doors will open on the right
B2		Transfer Corridor
B3	Northbound	← Line 7 towards Huangpi Square (Changmatou)
B3	Island platform, doors will open on the left
B3	Southbound	Line 7 towards Qinglongshan Ditiexiaozhen (Wangjiadun East) →

== Gallery ==
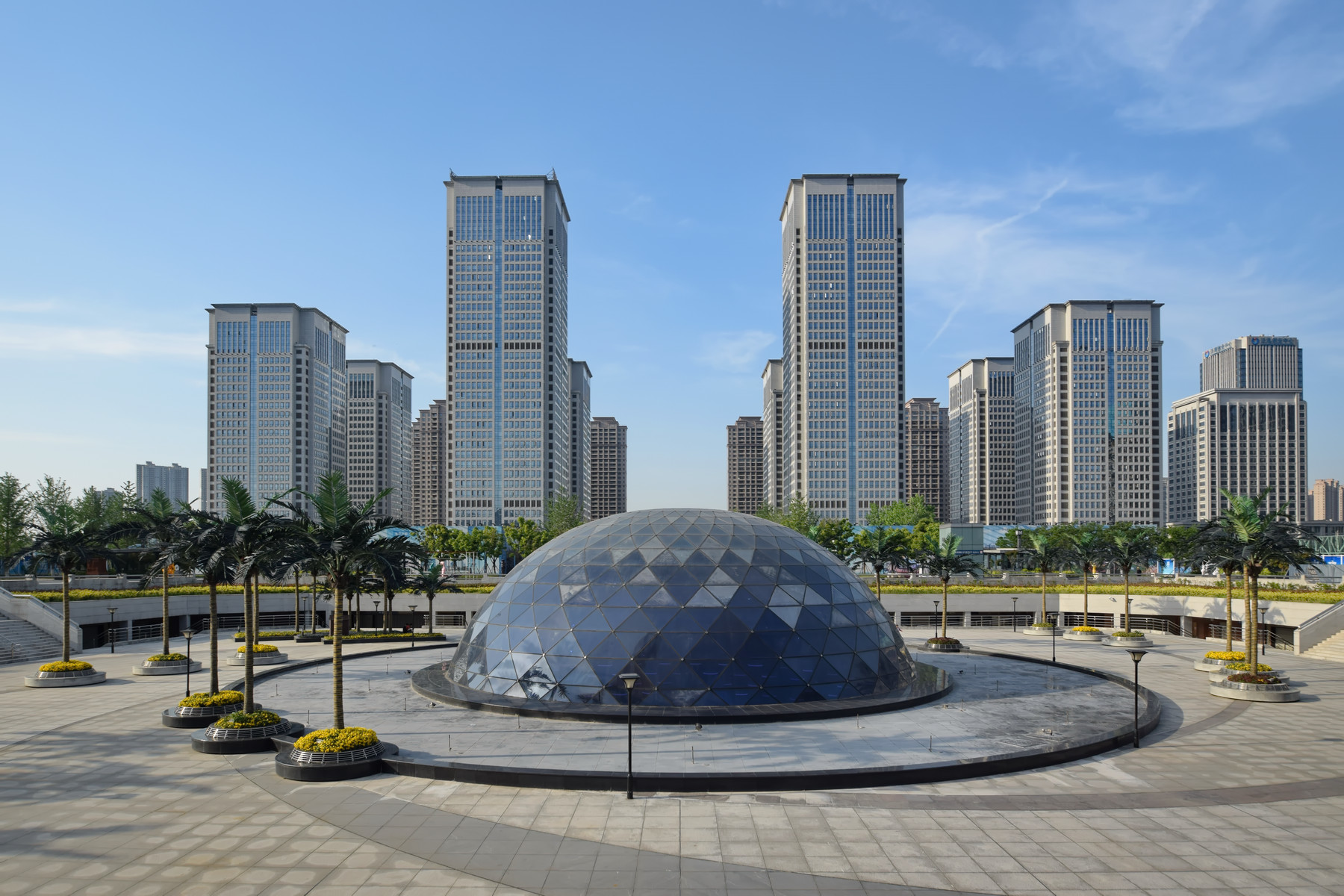
Exterior

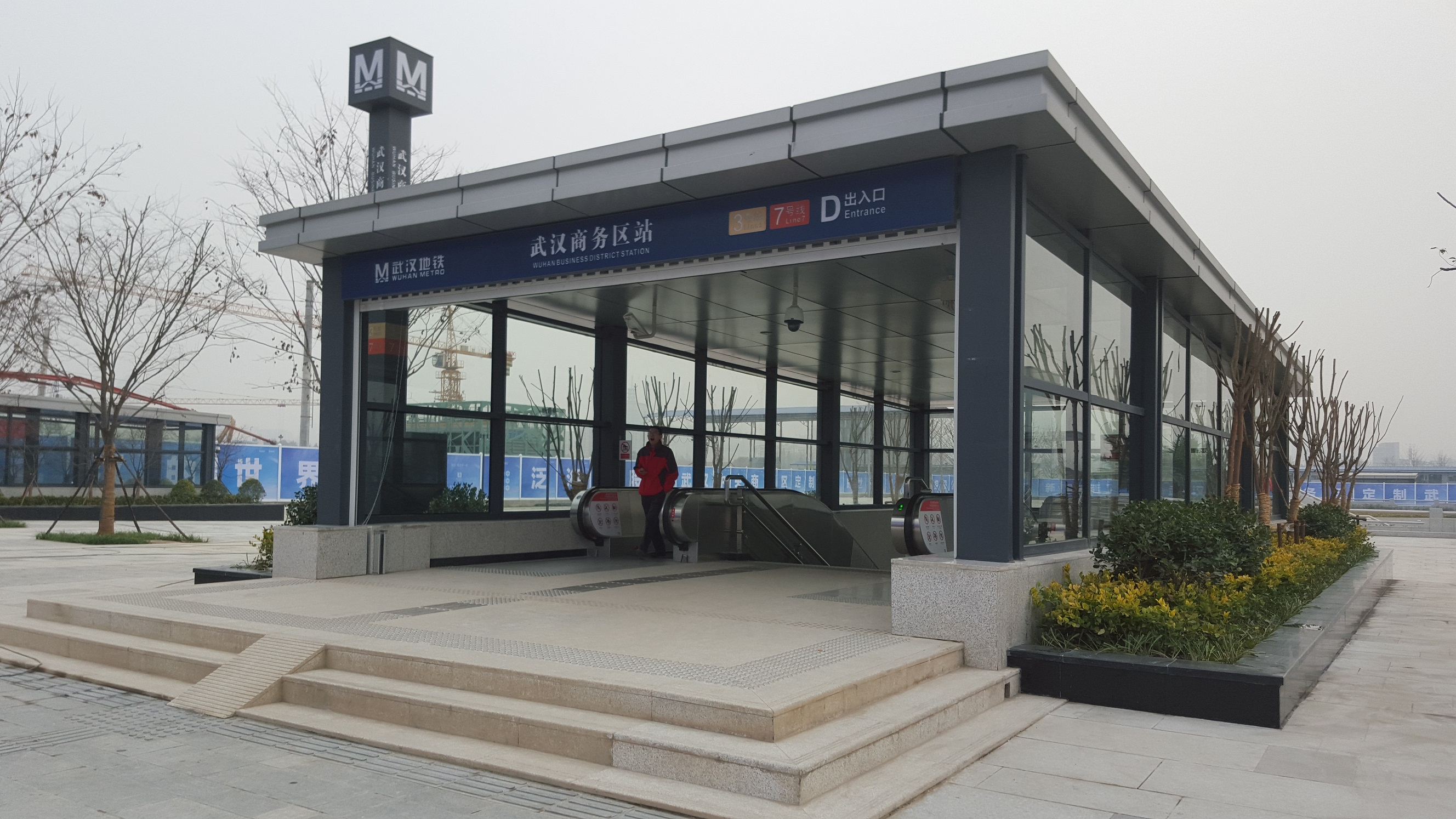
Entrance D

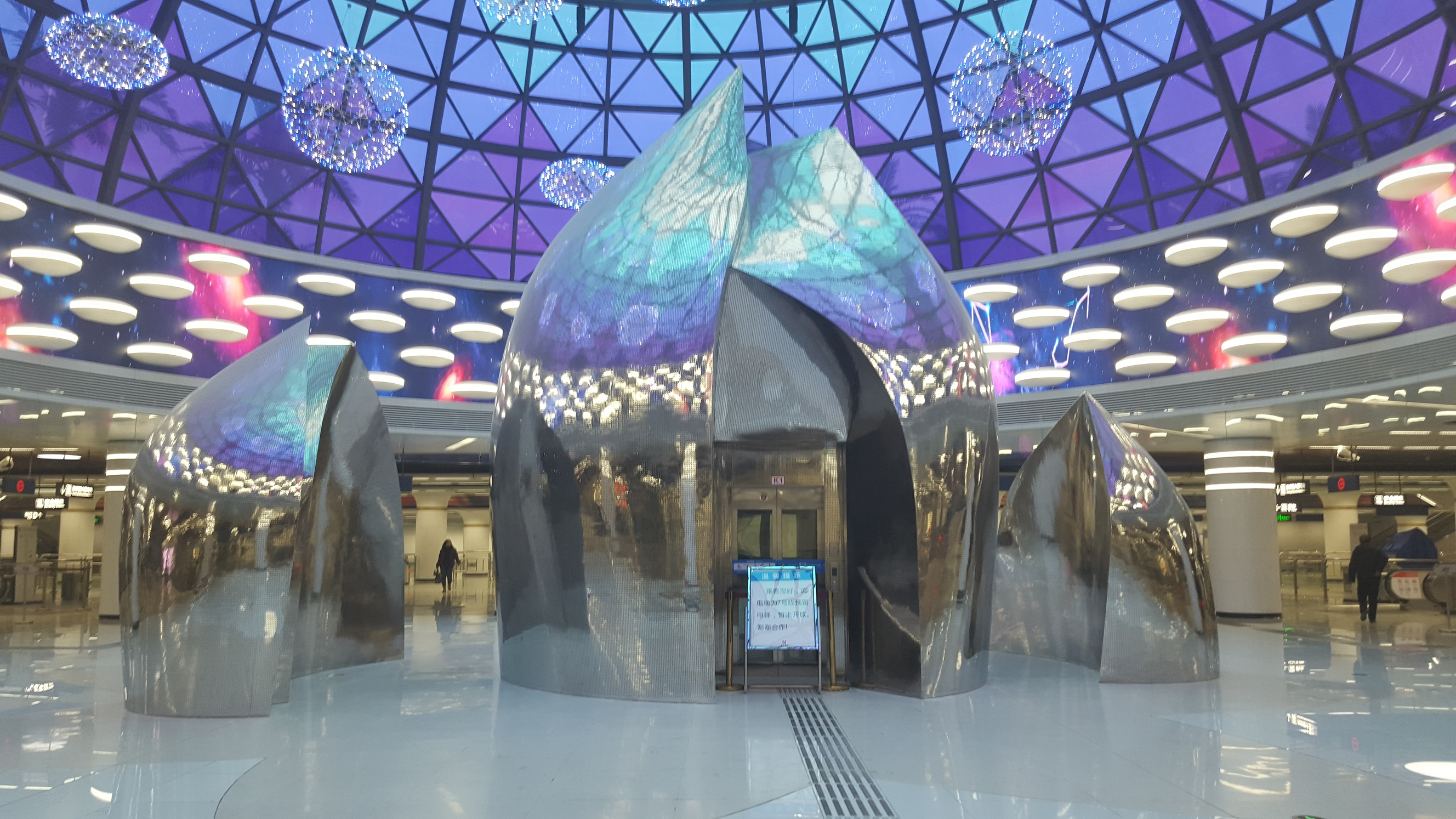
Concourse

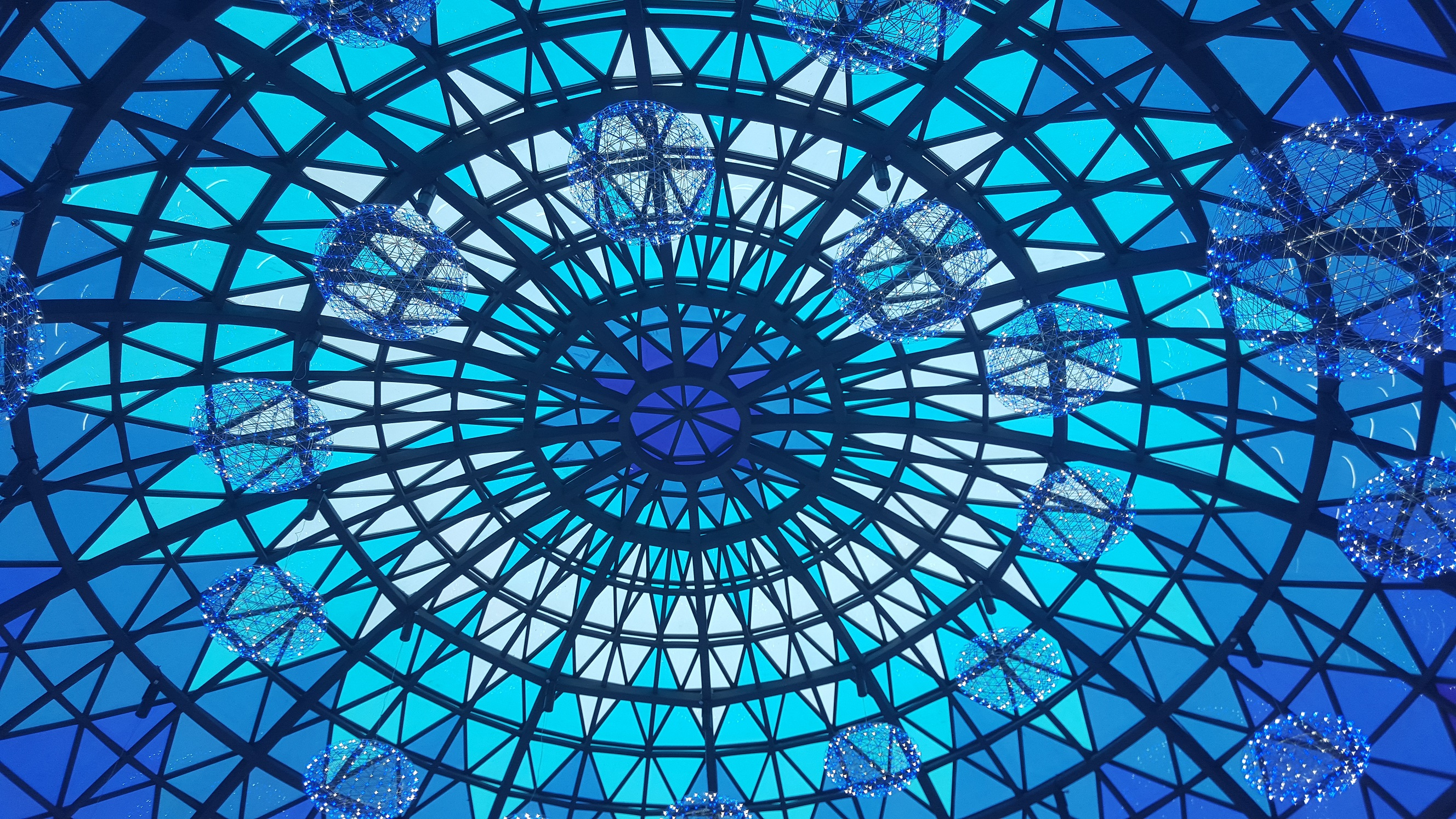
Concourse Dome

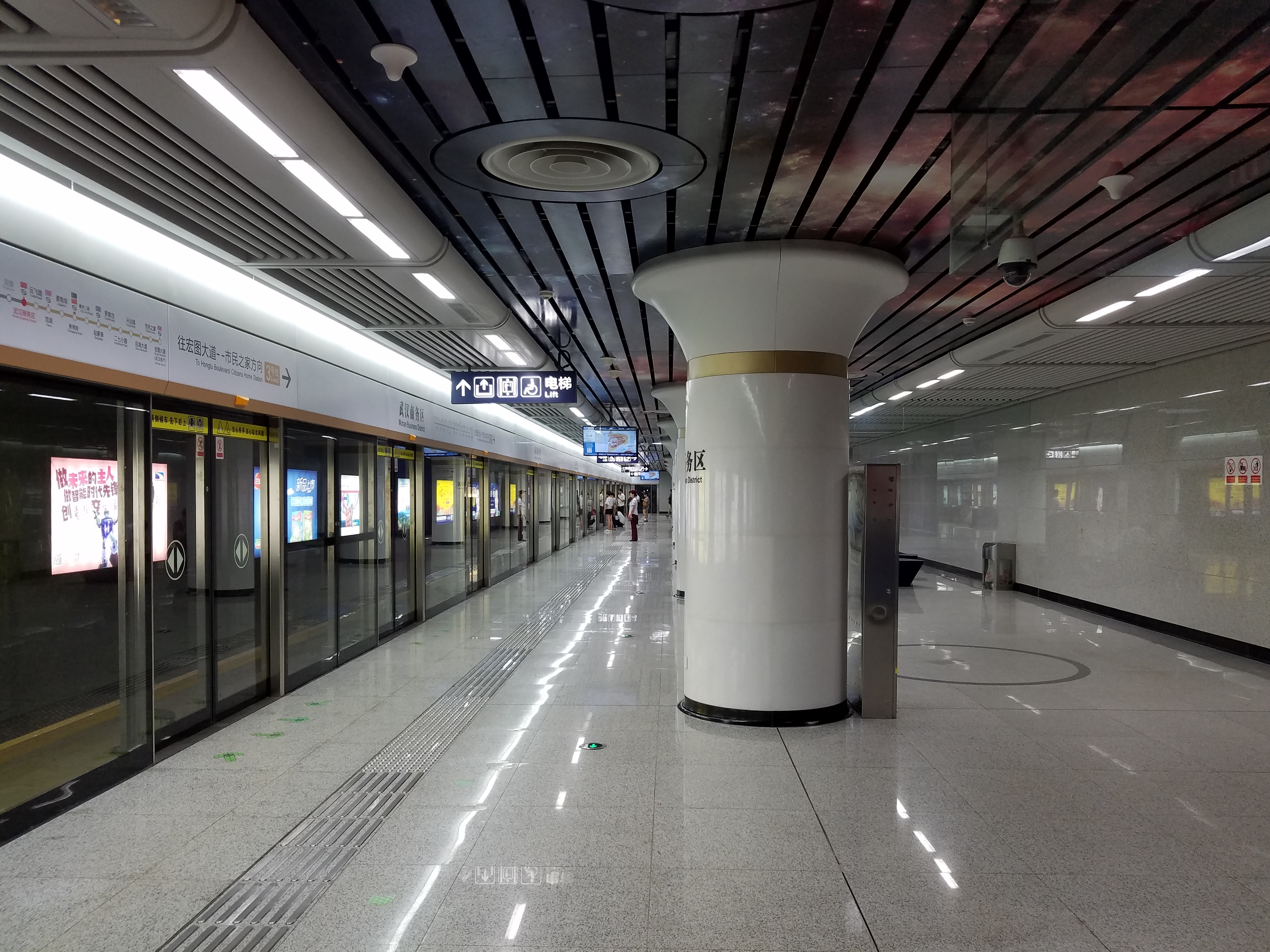
Line 3 platform

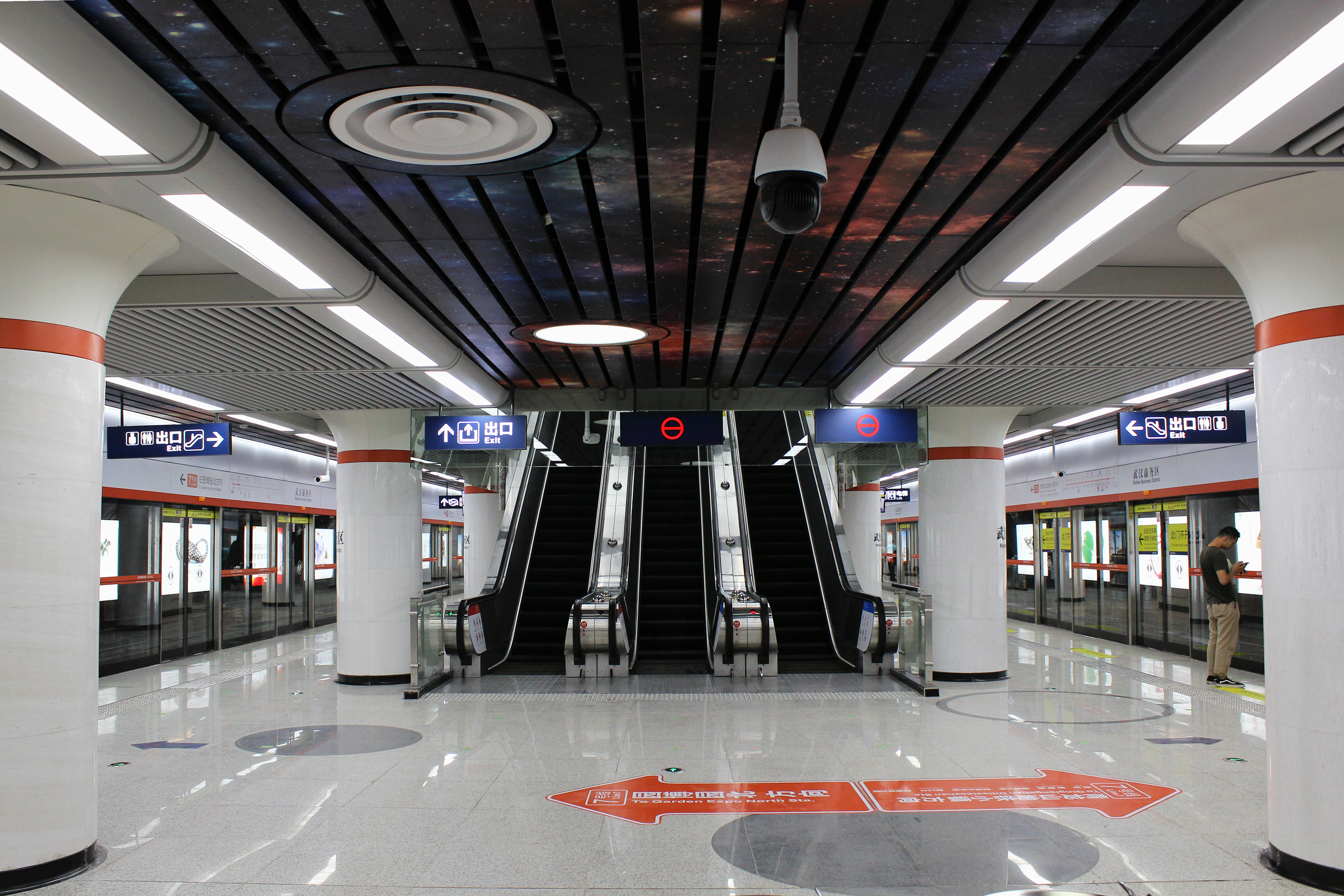
Line 7 platform
