= Line 7 (Wuhan Metro) =

Line of Wuhan Metro

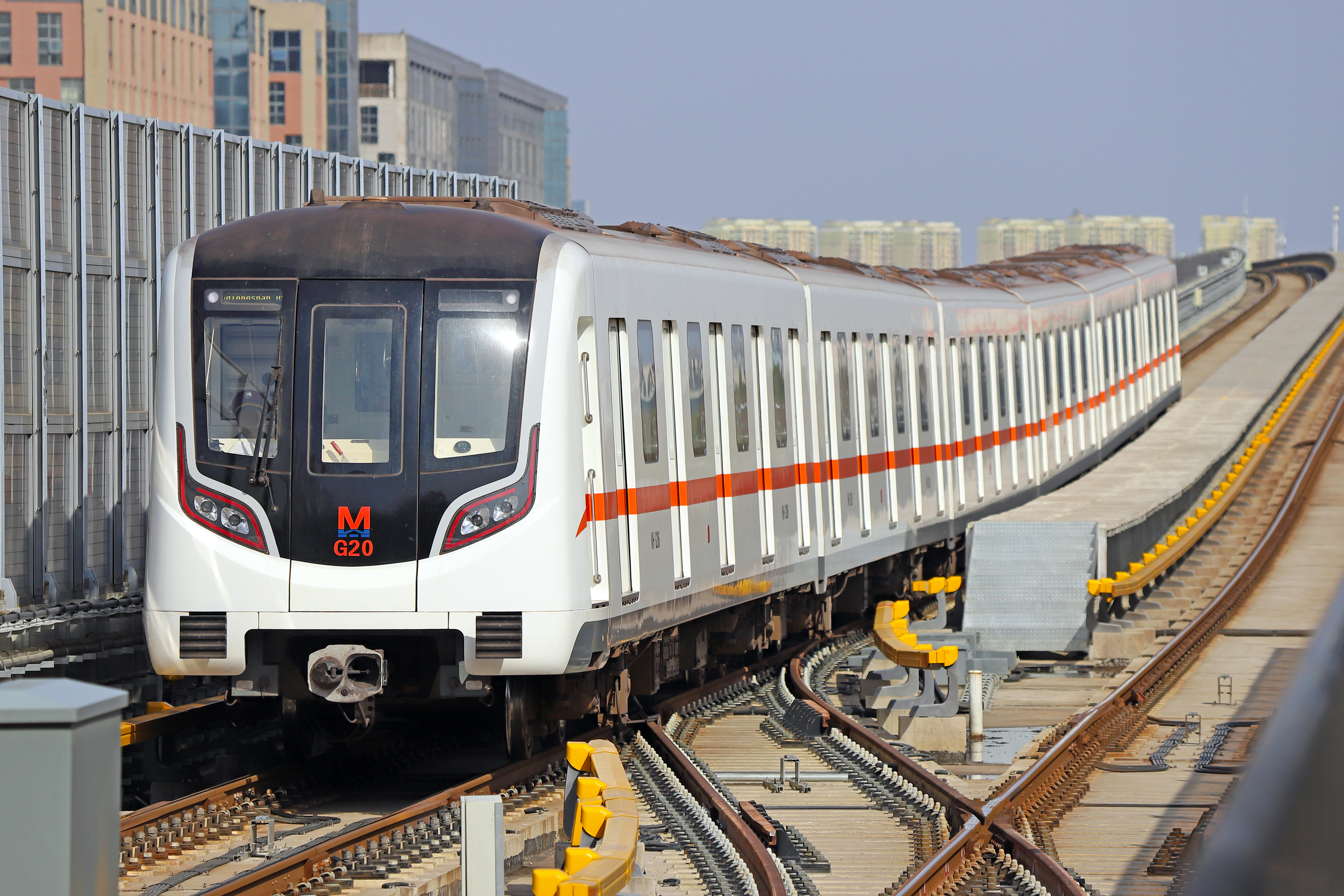

Overview
- Other name(s): Qianchuan line (前川线) (North extension); Zhifang line (纸坊线) (South extension)
- Status: Operating
- Owner: Government of Wuhan
- Locale: Wuhan, Hubei
- Termini: Huangpi Square; Qinglongshan Ditiexiaozhen
- Stations: 36

Service
- Type: Rapid transit
- System: Wuhan Metro
- Services: 1
- Operator: Wuhan Metro Group Co., Ltd.
- Rolling stock: CRRC Zhuzhou Locomotive Chinese Type A

History
- Opened: 1 October 2018; 7 years ago

Technical
- Line length: 83.6 km (51.9 mi)
- Number of tracks: 2
- Character: Underground and elevated
- Track gauge: 1,435 mm (4 ft 8 1/2 in)

Line 7 of Wuhan Metro (Chinese: 武汉地铁7号线) is a metro line in Wuhan. The line runs from Huangpi Square station in Huangpi District to Qinglongshan Ditiexiaozhen station in Jiangxia District.

== Opening timeline ==
Segment	Commencement	Length	Station(s)	Name
Garden Expo North — Yezhihu	1 October 2018	30.413 km (18.90 mi)	19	Phase 1
Yezhihu — Qinglongshan Ditiexiaozhen	28 December 2018	16.97 km (10.54 mi)	7	Zhifang line (Southern Extension)
Garden Expo North — Hengdian	30 December 2022	21.12 km (13.12 mi)	7	Qianchuan line (Northern Extension)
Hengdian — Huangpi Square	1 October 2024	15.11 km (9.39 mi)	3	Qianchuan line (Northern Extension)

== Stations ==
Route Map of Line 7

●	All trains stop
	No service at this section
△	Last train bound for Huangpi Square
▲	Last train bound for Garden Expo North

Section	Service pattern			Station name		Connections	Distance km		Location
Section	Local	LT1	LT2	English	Chinese	Connections	Distance km		Location
Qianchuan line (Northern extension)	●	△		Huangpi Square	黄陂广场				Huangpi
Qianchuan line (Northern extension)	●	△		Baitai Road	百泰路				Huangpi
Qianchuan line (Northern extension)	●	△		Qingzicun (Rail Transit Industry Innovation Base)	青仔村（轨道产业基地）				Huangpi
Qianchuan line (Northern extension)	|	|		Yupengwan (reserved)	余彭塆				Huangpi
Qianchuan line (Northern extension)	●	△		Hengdian	横店				Huangpi
Qianchuan line (Northern extension)	●	△		Yufu Road	裕福路				Huangpi
Qianchuan line (Northern extension)	●	△		Tianyang Boulevard	天阳大道				Huangpi
Qianchuan line (Northern extension)	●	△		Tenglong Boulevard	腾龙大道				Huangpi
Qianchuan line (Northern extension)	●	△		Julong Boulevard	巨龙大道	2			Huangpi
Qianchuan line (Northern extension)	●	△		Tangyunhai Road	汤云海路				Huangpi
Qianchuan line (Northern extension)	●	△		Machi	马池				Dongxihu
Phase 1	●	△	▲	Garden Expo North	园博园北	6	0.000	0.000	Dongxihu
Phase 1	●	△	▲	Garden Expo (Hankouli)	园博园（汉口里）		2.137	2.137	Jianghan / Qiaokou
Phase 1	●	△	▲	Changmatou	常码头		1.885	4.022	Qiaokou
Phase 1	●	△	▲	Wuhan Business District	武汉商务区	3	1.586	5.608	Jianghan
Phase 1	●	△	▲	Wangjiadun East	王家墩东	2	1.482	7.090	Jianghan
Phase 1	●	△	▲	Qushuilou	取水楼		1.164	8.254	Jianghan
Phase 1	●	△	▲	Xianggang Road	香港路	3 6	1.458	9.712	Jianghan / Jiang'an
Phase 1	●	△	▲	Sanyang Road	三阳路	1	1.846	11.558	Jiang'an
Phase 1	●	△	▲	Xujiapeng	徐家棚	5 8	3.502	15.060	Wuchang
Phase 1	●	△	▲	Hubei University	湖北大学		1.591	16.651	Wuchang
Phase 1	●	△	▲	Xinhe Street	新河街		2.067	18.718	Wuchang
Phase 1	●	△	▲	Pangxiejia	螃蟹岬	2	1.141	19.859	Wuchang
Phase 1	●	△	▲	Xiaodongmen	小东门		0.859	20.718	Wuchang
Phase 1	●	△	▲	Wuchang Railway Station	武昌火车站	4; 11 12 (Note: Out of system transfer at East Square of Wuchang Railway Station); WCN: WXN	1.374	22.092	Wuchang
Phase 1	●	△	▲	Rui'an Street	瑞安街		1.860	23.952	Wuchang
Phase 1	●	△	▲	Jian'an Street	建安街		1.383	25.335	Hongshan
Phase 1	●	△	▲	Hubei University of Technology	湖工大		2.294	27.629	Hongshan
Phase 1	●	△	▲	Banqiao	板桥		1.067	28.696	Hongshan
Phase 1	●	△	▲	Yezhihu	野芷湖	8	1.717	30.413	Hongshan
Zhifang line (Southern extension)	●	△	▲	Xinlucun	新路村		2.391	32.804	Hongshan
Zhifang line (Southern extension)	●	△	▲	Dahualing	大花岭		3.438	36.242	Jiangxia
Zhifang line (Southern extension)	●	△	▲	Jiangxiaketing	江夏客厅		2.507	38.749	Jiangxia
Zhifang line (Southern extension)	●	△	▲	Tanxinpei Park	谭鑫培公园		2.000	40.749	Jiangxia
Zhifang line (Southern extension)	●	△	▲	Beihua Street	北华街		1.610	42.359	Jiangxia
Zhifang line (Southern extension)	●	△	▲	Zhifang Avenue	纸坊大街		1.361	43.720	Jiangxia
Zhifang line (Southern extension)	●	△	▲	Qinglongshan Ditiexiaozhen	青龙山地铁小镇		3.243	46.963	Jiangxia
