= Banqiao station (disambiguation) =

Banqiao station is a Taipei Metro railway station.

Banqiao station may also refer to:

- Banqiao station (Guangzhou Metro)
- Banqiao station (Wuhan Metro)
