= Hubei University of Technology station =

Metro station in Wuhan, China

Hubei University of Technology 湖工大 metro
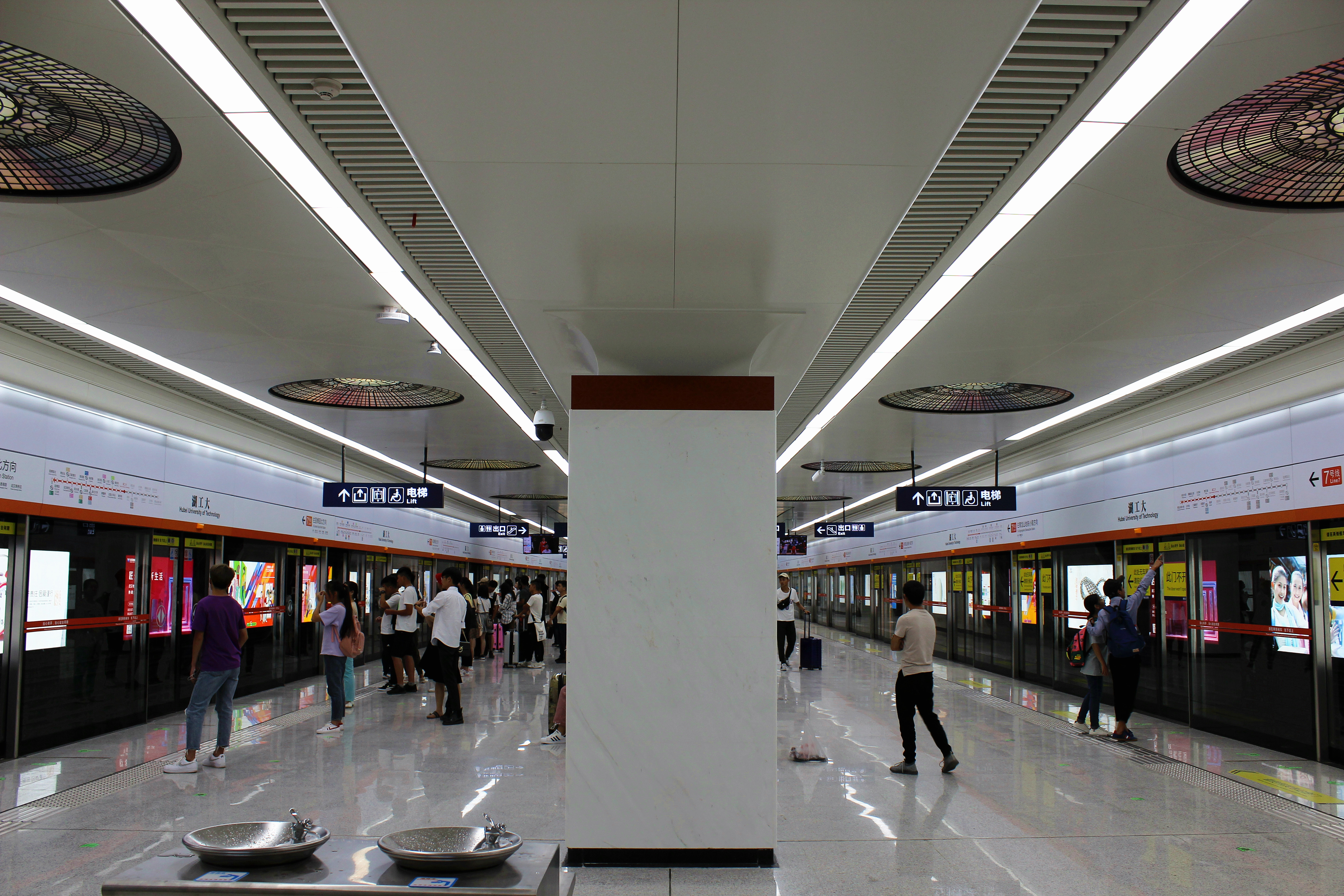

General information
- Location: Hongshan District, Wuhan, Hubei; China
- Operated by: Wuhan Metro Co., Ltd
- Line: Line 7
- Platforms: 2 (1 island platform)

Construction
- Structure type: Underground

History
- Opened: October 1, 2018 (Line 7)

Services
| Preceding station | Wuhan Metro | Following station |
|---|---|---|
| Jian'an Street towards Huangpi Square | Line 7 | Banqiao towards Qinglongshan Ditiexiaozhen |
Location

Hubei University of Technology Station (Chinese: 湖工大站) is a station on Line 7 of the Wuhan Metro. It entered revenue service on October 1, 2018. It is located in Hongshan District and it serves the Hubei University of Technology.

== Station layout ==
| G | Entrances and Exits |
| B1 | Concourse | Faregates, Station Agent |
| B2 | Northbound | ← Line 7 towards Huangpi Square (Jian'an Street) |
| B2 | Island platform, doors will open on the left |
| B2 | Southbound | Line 7 towards Qinglongshan Ditiexiaozhen (Banqiao) → |
