= 园博园站 =

园博园站 may refer to:

- Garden Expo Park station, a Beijing Subway station
- The EXPO Garden station, a Chongqing Rail Transit station
- Garden Expo station, a Wuhan Metro station
- Yuanboyuan station (Jinan Metro), a Jinan Metro station
- Yuanboyuan station (Shijiazhuang Metro), a Shijiazhuang Metro station
