= Xinlucun station =

Metro station in Wuhan, China

Xinlucun 新路村 metro
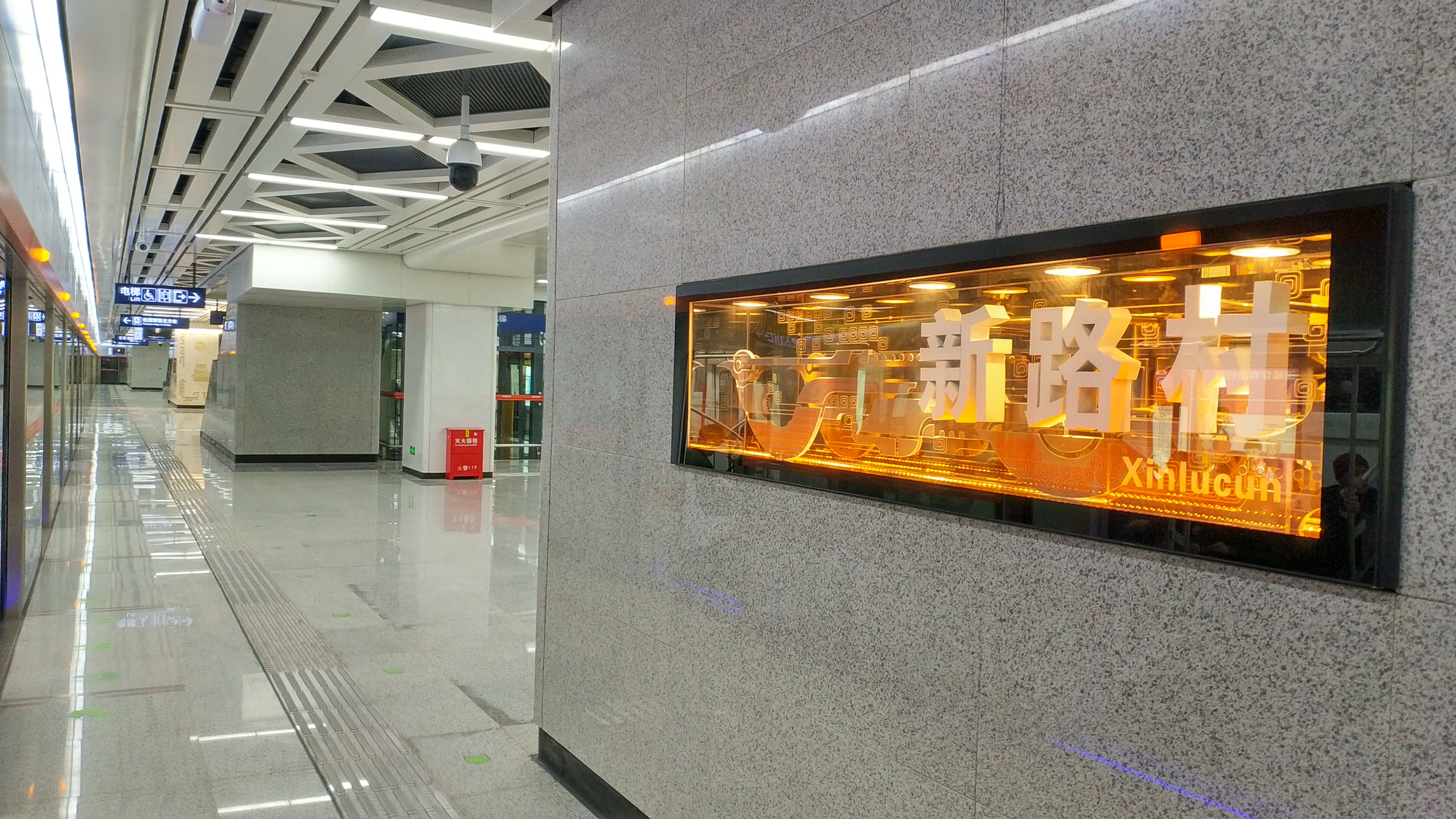

General information
- Location: Hongshan District, Wuhan, Hubei; China
- Coordinates: 30.44428°N 114.31284°E
- Operated by: Wuhan Metro Co., Ltd
- Line: Line 7
- Platforms: 2 (1 island platform)

Construction
- Structure type: Underground

History
- Opened: December 28, 2018 (Line 7)

Services
Preceding station	Wuhan Metro	Following station
Yezhihu towards Huangpi Square	Line 7	Dahualing towards Qinglongshan Ditiexiaozhen
Location

Xinlucun Station (Chinese: 新路村站) is a station on Line 7 of the Wuhan Metro. It entered revenue service on December 28, 2018. It is located in Hongshan District.

== Station layout ==
G	Entrances and Exits
B1	Concourse	Faregates, Station Agent
B2	Northbound	← Line 7 towards Huangpi Square (Yezhihu)
B2	Island platform, doors will open on the left
B2	Southbound	Line 7 towards Qinglongshan Ditiexiaozhen (Dahualing) →
