= Rui'an Street station =

Metro station in Wuhan, China

Rui'an Street 瑞安街
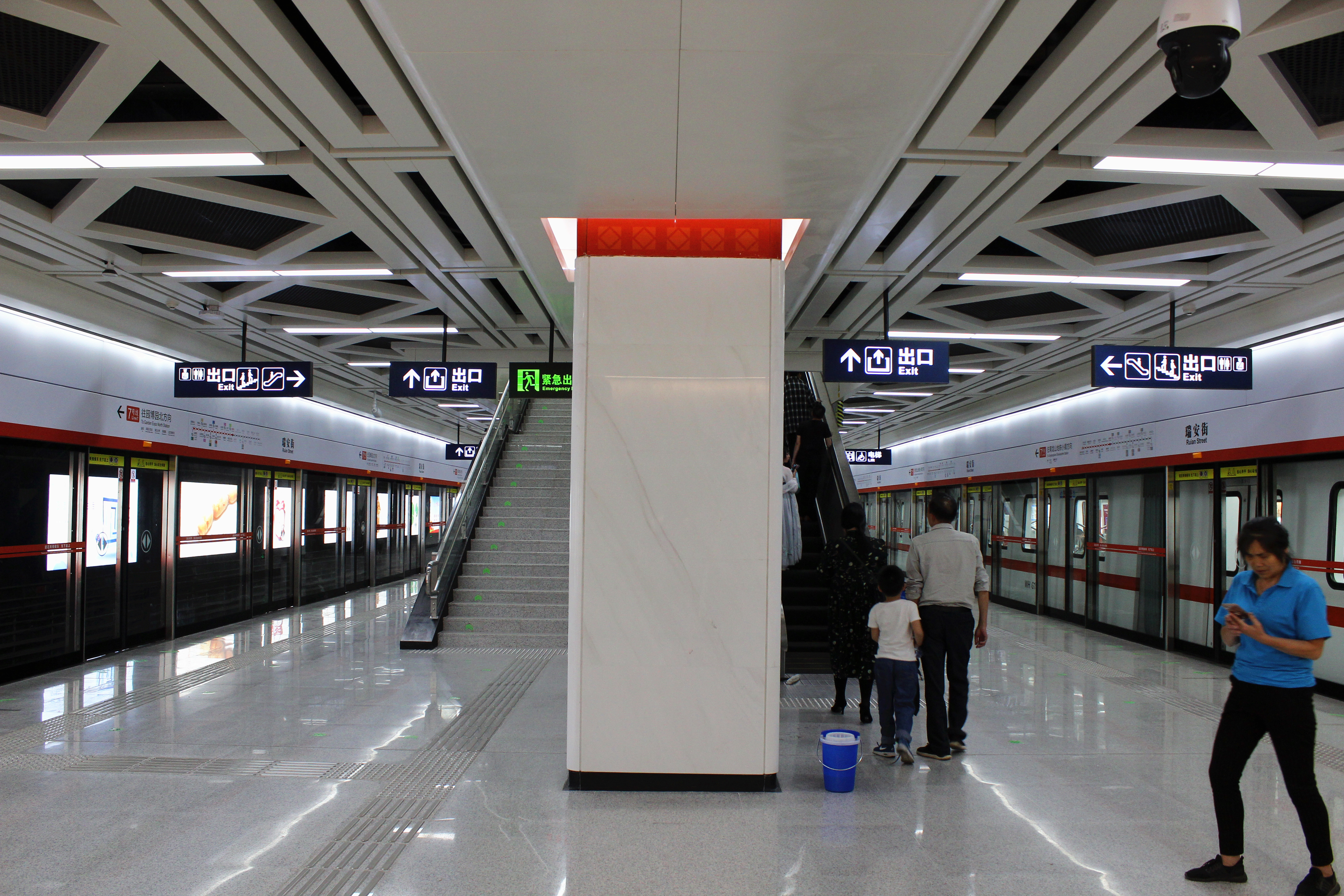

General information
- Location: Wuchang District, Wuhan, Hubei; China
- Coordinates: 30.5176°N 114.3087°E
- Operated by: Wuhan Metro Co., Ltd
- Line: Line 7
- Platforms: 2 (1 island platform)

Construction
- Structure type: Underground

History
- Opened: October 1, 2018 (Line 7)

Services
Preceding station	Wuhan Metro	Following station
Wuchang Railway Station towards Huangpi Square	Line 7	Jian'an Street towards Qinglongshan Ditiexiaozhen
Location

Rui'an Street Station (Chinese: 瑞安街站; pinyin: Ruì'ān Jiē zhàn) is a station on Line 7 of the Wuhan Metro. It entered revenue service on October 1, 2018. It is located in Wuchang District.

== Station layout ==
G	Entrances and Exits
B1	Concourse	Faregates, Station Agent
B2	Northbound	← Line 7 towards Huangpi Square (Wuchang Railway Station)
B2	Island platform, doors will open on the left
B2	Southbound	Line 7 towards Qinglongshan Ditiexiaozhen (Jian'an Street) →
