= Julong Boulevard station =

Wuhan Metro station

Julong Boulevard 巨龙大道 metro
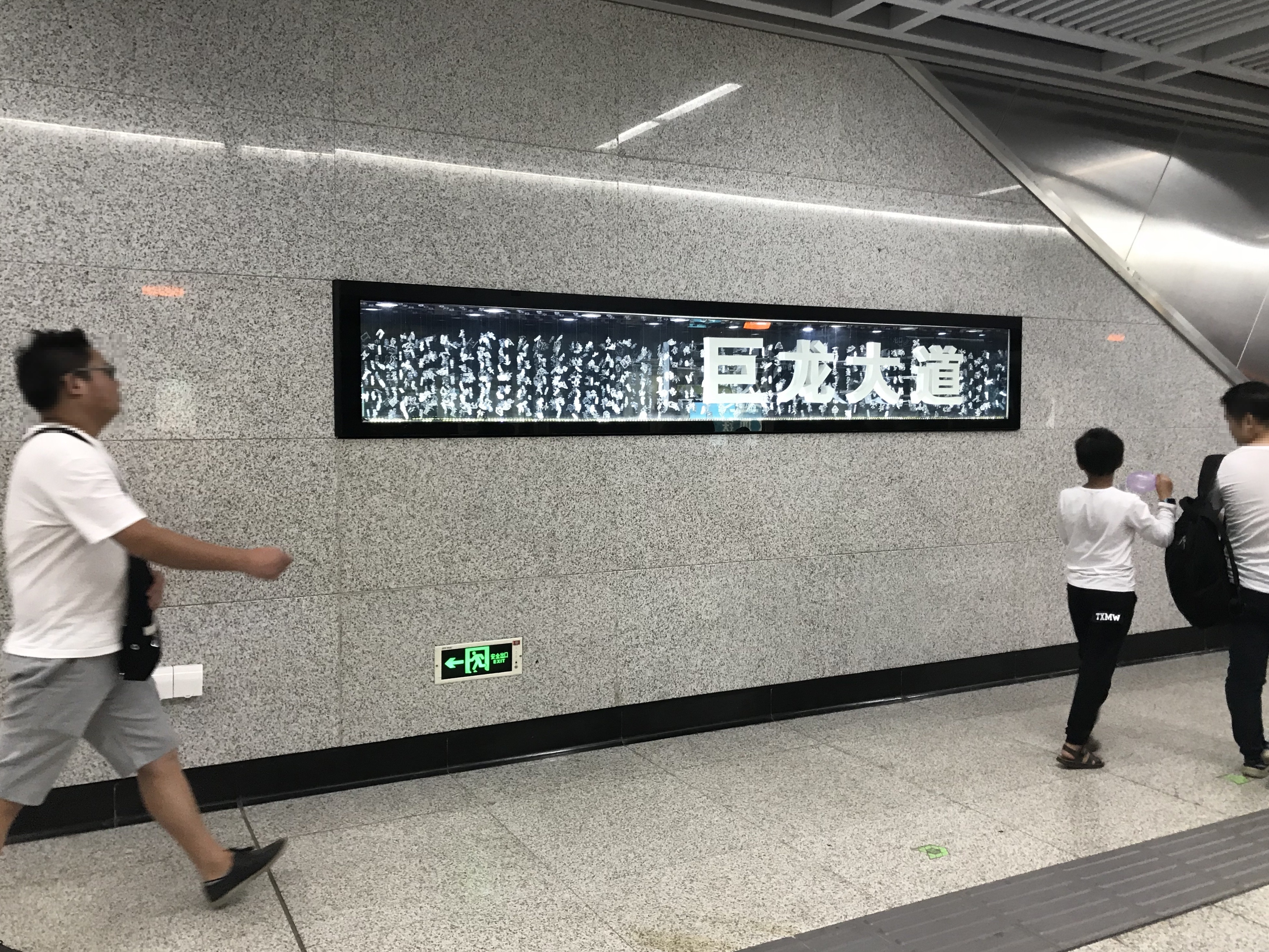

General information
- Location: Huangpi District, Wuhan, Hubei; China
- Operated by: Wuhan Metro Co., Ltd
- Lines: Line 2 Line 7
- Platforms: 2 (1 island platform)

Construction
- Structure type: Underground

History
- Opened: December 28, 2016 (Line 2); December 30, 2022 (Line 7)

Services
Preceding station	Wuhan Metro	Following station
Songjiagang towards Tianhe International Airport	Line 2	Panlongcheng towards Fozuling
Tenglong Boulevard towards Huangpi Square	Line 7	Tangyunhai Road towards Qinglongshan Ditiexiaozhen
Location

Julong Boulevard Station (Chinese: 巨龙大道站) is a transfer station on Line 2 and Line 7 of Wuhan Metro. It entered revenue service on December 28, 2016. It is located in Huangpi District.

== Station layout ==
G	Entrances and Exits	Exits A-D
B1	Concourse	Faregates, Station Agent
B2	Northbound	← Line 2 towards Tianhe International Airport (Songjiagang)
B2	Island platform, doors will open on the left
B2	Southbound	Line 2 towards Fozuling (Panlongcheng) →
B3	Northbound	← Line 7 towards Huangpi Square (Tenglong Boulevard)
B3	Island platform, doors will open on the left
B3	Southbound	Line 7 towards Qinglongshan Ditiexiaozhen (Tangyunhai Road) →
