= Changmatou station =

Metro station in Wuhan, China

Changmatou 常码头 metro

General information
- Location: Qiaokou District, Wuhan, Hubei; China
- Coordinates: 30.60754°N 114.22895°E
- Operated by: Wuhan Metro Co., Ltd
- Line: Line 7
- Platforms: 2 (1 island platform)

Construction
- Structure type: Underground

History
- Opened: October 1, 2018 (Line 7)

Services
Preceding station	Wuhan Metro	Following station
Garden Expo towards Huangpi Square	Line 7	Wuhan Business District towards Qinglongshan Ditiexiaozhen
Location

Changmatou Station (Chinese: 常码头站) is a station on Line 7 of the Wuhan Metro. It entered revenue service on October 1, 2018. It is located in Qiaokou District.

== Station layout ==
G	Entrances and Exits	Exits A-C
B1	Concourse	Faregates, Station Agent
B2	Northbound	← Line 7 towards Huangpi Square (Garden Expo)
B2	Island platform, doors will open on the left
B2	Southbound	Line 7 towards Qinglongshan Ditiexiaozhen (Wuhan Business District) →
