= Zhengdian Subdistrict =

Zhengdian Subdistrict 郑店街道
- Subdistrict
- Location in Hubei
- Coordinates: 30°19′57″N 114°15′4″E
- Country: People's Republic of China
- Province: Hubei
- Prefecture-level city: Wuhan
- District: Jiangxia District
- Time zone: UTC+8 (China Standard)

Zhengdian Subdistrict (simplified Chinese: 郑店街道; traditional Chinese: 鄭店街道; pinyin: Zhèngdiàn Jiēdào) is a subdistrict in Jiangxia District, Wuhan, Hubei, China. As of 2018, it has 2 residential communities and 21 villages under its administration.

== See also ==
- List of township-level divisions of Hubei
