= Panlongcheng station =

Wuhan Metro station

Panlongcheng 盘龙城 metro
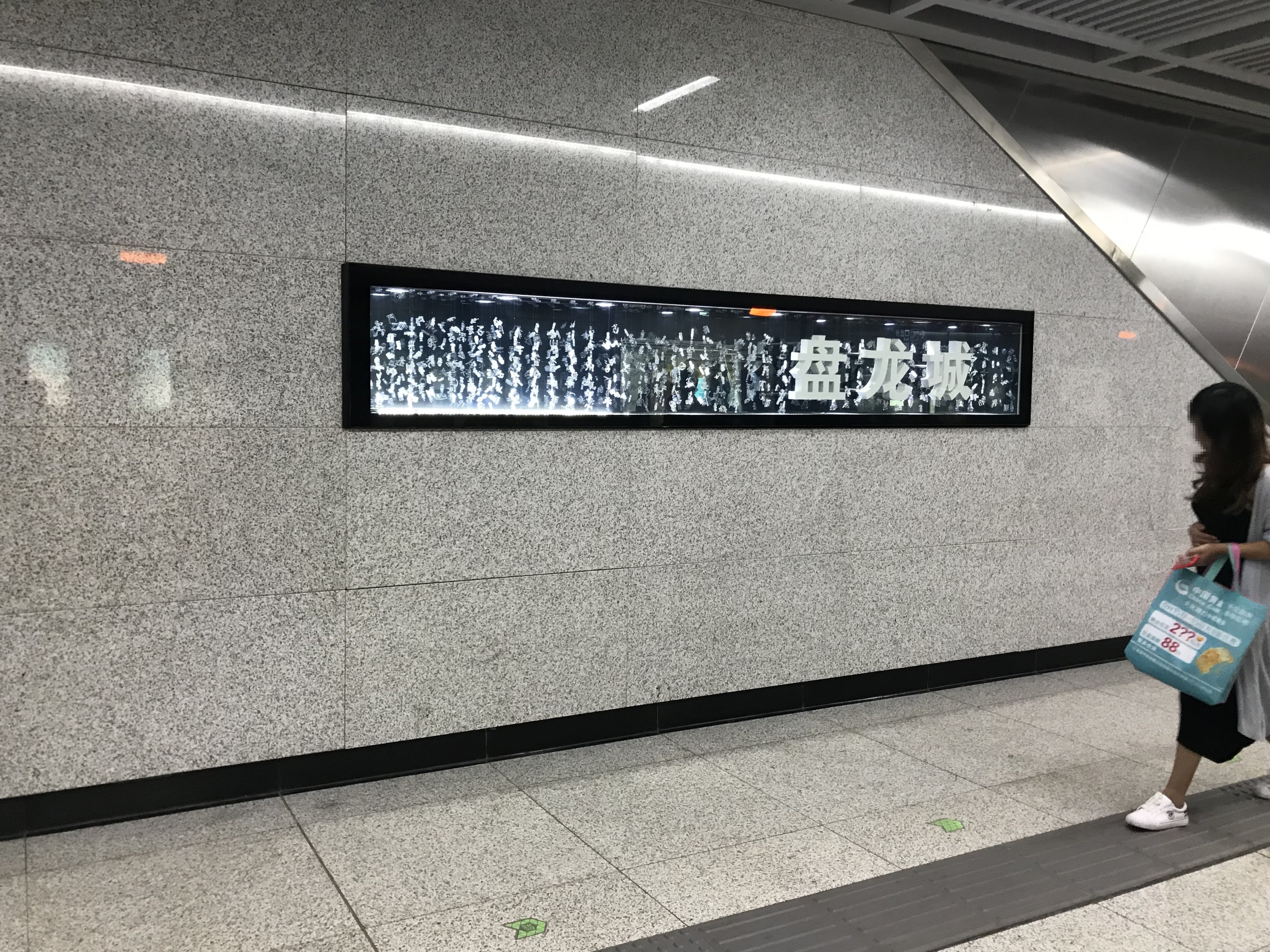

General information
- Location: Huangpi District, Wuhan, Hubei; China
- Operated by: Wuhan Metro Co., Ltd
- Line: Line 2
- Platforms: 2 (1 island platform)

Construction
- Structure type: Underground

History
- Opened: December 28, 2016 (Line 2)

Services
Preceding station	Wuhan Metro	Following station
Julong Boulevard towards Tianhe International Airport	Line 2	Hongtu Boulevard towards Fozuling
Location

Panlongcheng Station (Chinese: 盘龙城站) is a station on Line 2 of Wuhan Metro. It entered revenue service on December 28, 2016. It is located in Huangpi District.

== Station layout ==
G	Entrances and Exits	Exits A-D
B1	Concourse	Faregates, Station Agent
B2	Northbound	← Line 2 towards Tianhe International Airport (Julong Boulevard)
B2	Island platform, doors will open on the left
B2	Southbound	Line 2 towards Fozuling (Hongtu Boulevard) →
