= Jiangxia, Wuhan =

Jiangxia 江夏区
- District
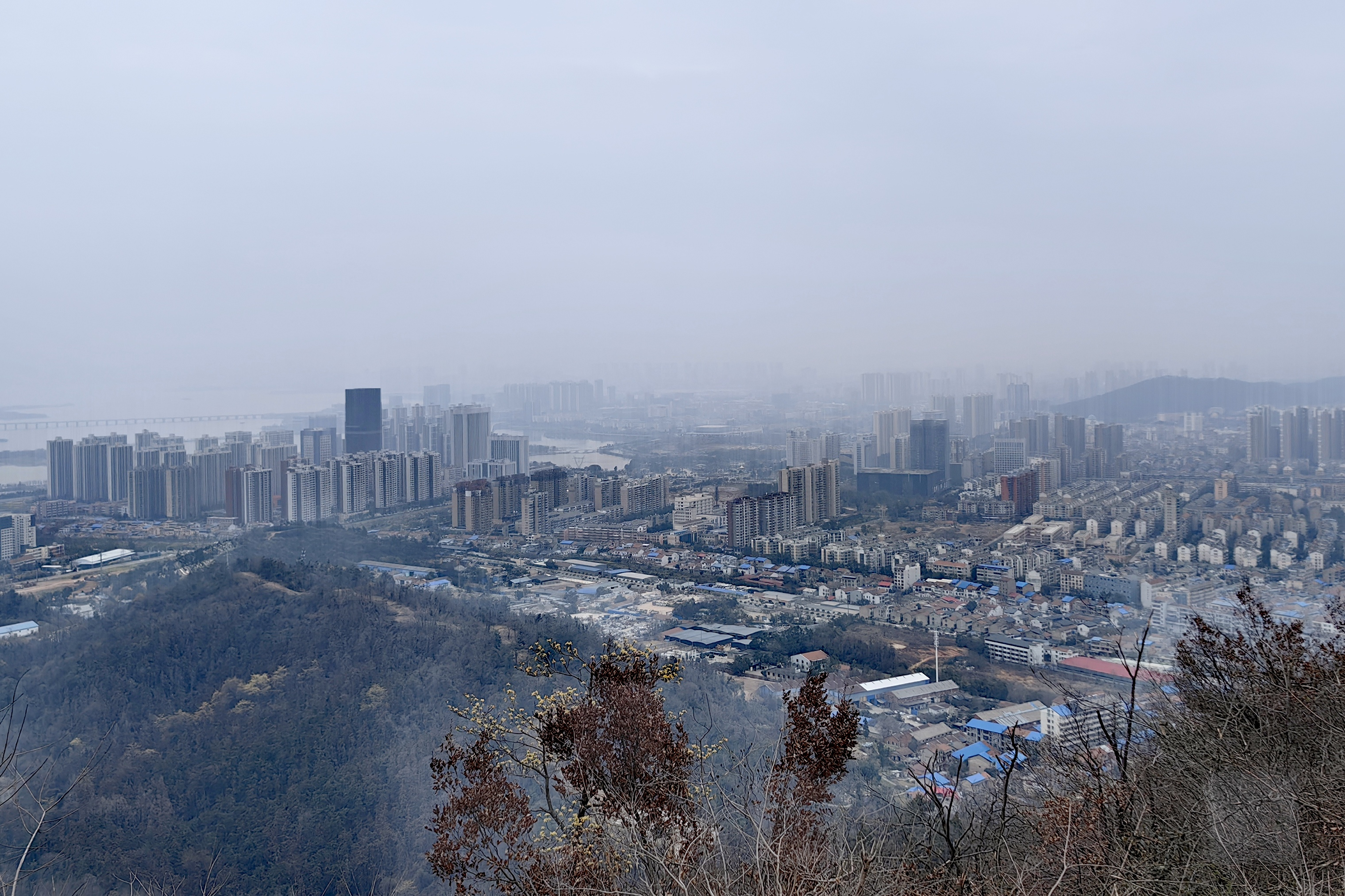
- A view of Jiangxia from the top of Bafen Mountain
- Interactive map of Jiangxia
- Location in Hubei
- Coordinates: 30°20′23″N 114°18′37″E
- Country: People's Republic of China
- Province: Hubei
- Sub-provincial city: Wuhan

Area
  - Total: 2,010.00 km^{2} (776.07 sq mi)

Population (2020)
  - Total: 1,308,469
  - Density: 650.980/km^{2} (1,686.03/sq mi)
- Time zone: UTC+8 (China Standard)
- Postal code: 4302XX
- Website: jiangxia.gov.cn

Jiangxia District (Chinese: 江夏区; pinyin: Jiāngxià Qū) is one of 13 urban districts of the prefecture-level city of Wuhan, the capital of Hubei province, China, situated on the eastern (right) bank of the Yangtze River. Jiangxia district has an area of 2,009 square kilometres (776 sq mi) and a population of 1,308,469 in 2020. It is the southernmost and most sparsely populated of Wuhan's districts. It borders the districts of Caidian and Hannan across the Yangtze and Hongshan to the north, as well as the prefecture-level cities of Ezhou to the east, Huangshi to the southeast, and Xianning to the south.

== Geography ==
Unlike most other districts into which the City of Wuhan is divided, Jingxia, until recently included no part of Wuhan's main urban core. However, in the first decades of the 21st century urban development in the southeastern part of Wuhan's urban area (south of Guanggu Circle) has spilled over from Hongshan District into Jiangxia District as well.

Most of Jiangxia District still consists of the rural area south of the Wuhan city center. Jingxia has its own urban core, which is a large residential area called Zhifang (纸坊) some 20 kilometres (12 mi) south of Wuhan proper.

The Longquanshan Scenic Area (龙泉山), which contains the tombs of the Ming Princes of Chu (Wuchang-based descendants of the Hongwu Emperor) is located in the northeastern part of Jiangxi District. That area must have been quite rural, and remote from the provincial capital, Wuchang, in the Ming days; but today's Wuhan has spread to within a few kilometers of Longquanshan.

=== Administrative divisions ===
Jiangxia District administers:

Name (translation)	Chinese (S)
Zhifang Subdistrict	纸坊街道
Jinkou Subdistrict	金口街道
Wulongquan Subdistrict	乌龙泉街道
Zhengdian Subdistrict	郑店街道
Wulijie Subdistrict	五里界街道
Longquan Subdistrict	龙泉街道
Baoxie Subdistrict	豹澥街道
Shanpo Subdistrict	山坡街道
Fasi Subdistrict	法泗街道
Husi Subdistrict	湖泗街道
Shu'an Subdistrict	舒安街道
Anshan Subdistrict	安山街道
Fozuling Subdistrict	佛祖岭街道（东湖开发区）
Guandong Subdistrict	关东街道
Binhu Subdistrict	滨湖街道
Jinshui Office	金水办事处
Dawuchen Office	大屋陈办事处
Miaoshan Office	庙山办事处（江夏经济开发区）
Canglongdao Office	藏龙岛办事处
Daqiao New Area Office	大桥新区办事处
Jingang New Area	金港新区
Liangzihu Scenic Spot Office	梁子湖风景区办事处

== Climate ==
Climate data for Jiangxia District, elevation 74 m (243 ft), (1991–2020 normals)
Month	Jan	Feb	Mar	Apr	May	Jun	Jul	Aug	Sep	Oct	Nov	Dec	Year
Mean daily maximum °C (°F)	8.2 (46.8)	11.3 (52.3)	16.0 (60.8)	22.5 (72.5)	27.1 (80.8)	30.1 (86.2)	33.1 (91.6)	32.9 (91.2)	28.9 (84.0)	23.3 (73.9)	17.1 (62.8)	10.8 (51.4)	21.8 (71.2)
Daily mean °C (°F)	4.5 (40.1)	7.2 (45.0)	11.6 (52.9)	17.7 (63.9)	22.6 (72.7)	26.0 (78.8)	29.0 (84.2)	28.6 (83.5)	24.5 (76.1)	18.8 (65.8)	12.6 (54.7)	6.8 (44.2)	17.5 (63.5)
Mean daily minimum °C (°F)	1.9 (35.4)	4.3 (39.7)	8.3 (46.9)	14.0 (57.2)	18.9 (66.0)	22.7 (72.9)	25.8 (78.4)	25.3 (77.5)	21.1 (70.0)	15.4 (59.7)	9.4 (48.9)	3.9 (39.0)	14.3 (57.6)
Average precipitation mm (inches)	59.7 (2.35)	74.7 (2.94)	103.0 (4.06)	154.1 (6.07)	168.3 (6.63)	229.5 (9.04)	252.9 (9.96)	106.7 (4.20)	71.2 (2.80)	73.2 (2.88)	60.8 (2.39)	35.4 (1.39)	1,389.5 (54.71)
Average precipitation days (≥ 0.1 mm)	10.2	11.1	13.4	12.2	12.8	12.5	11.4	10.2	7.6	8.7	8.9	7.7	126.7
Average snowy days	3.9	2.0	0.8	0	0	0	0	0	0	0	0.3	1.2	8.2
Average relative humidity (%)	75	75	75	74	75	80	78	77	75	73	73	71	75
Mean monthly sunshine hours	92.0	90.7	119.1	142.7	160.2	151.6	204.9	205.5	165.8	146.3	128.6	119.1	1,726.5
Percentage possible sunshine	28	29	32	37	38	36	48	51	45	42	41	38	39
Source: China Meteorological Administration

== Infrastructure ==
The Wuhan authorities with the approval of the central authorities are building a temporary 1000-bed hospital in Jiangxia District to cope with the Wuhan coronavirus in January 2020. This is the second hospital to cope with the outbreak.

== Transport ==
There are two stations of the Line 8, Wuhan Metro in Jiangxia District: Huangjiahu Metro Town Station and Military Game Athlete Village Station.

The Wulongquan East Railway Station (presently, no passenger service) which is part of the Wuhan-Guangzhou High-speed Railway is located within the district.

The Wuhan–Xianning Intercity Railway, the region's first dedicated commuter rail line, opened in the late 2013, has several stations in the district. In particular, the Zhifang East Station (纸坊东站; 30.356176°N 114.339223°E) serves the district's urban core. It takes 40-50 min by commuter train from Zhifang East to Wuhan's Wuchang Railway Station.

As of 2012, the authorities were considering repurposing the military Shanpo Airfield (山坡机场; 30°05′17″N 114°18′52″E), located in the district's Shanpo Township (Shanpo Subdistrict since August 2011), as a commercial cargo airport. The possibility for dual civil and military use is considered as well. If the plans are implemented, Shanpo will become Wuhan's second airport (after Tianhe).

== Gallery ==
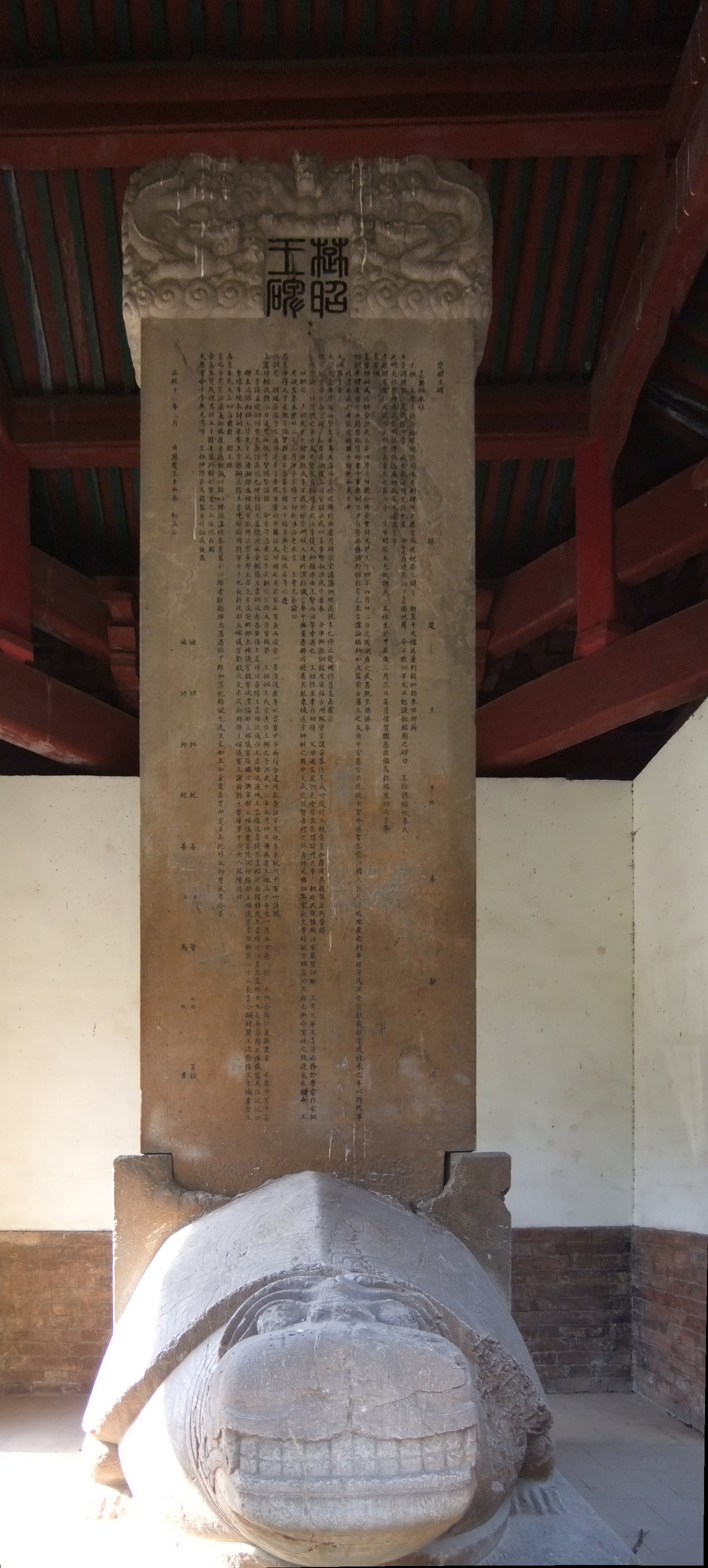
The tortoise-borne memorial stele for Zhu Zhen (1367-1424), the first of the Ming Princes of Chu buried at Longquanshan

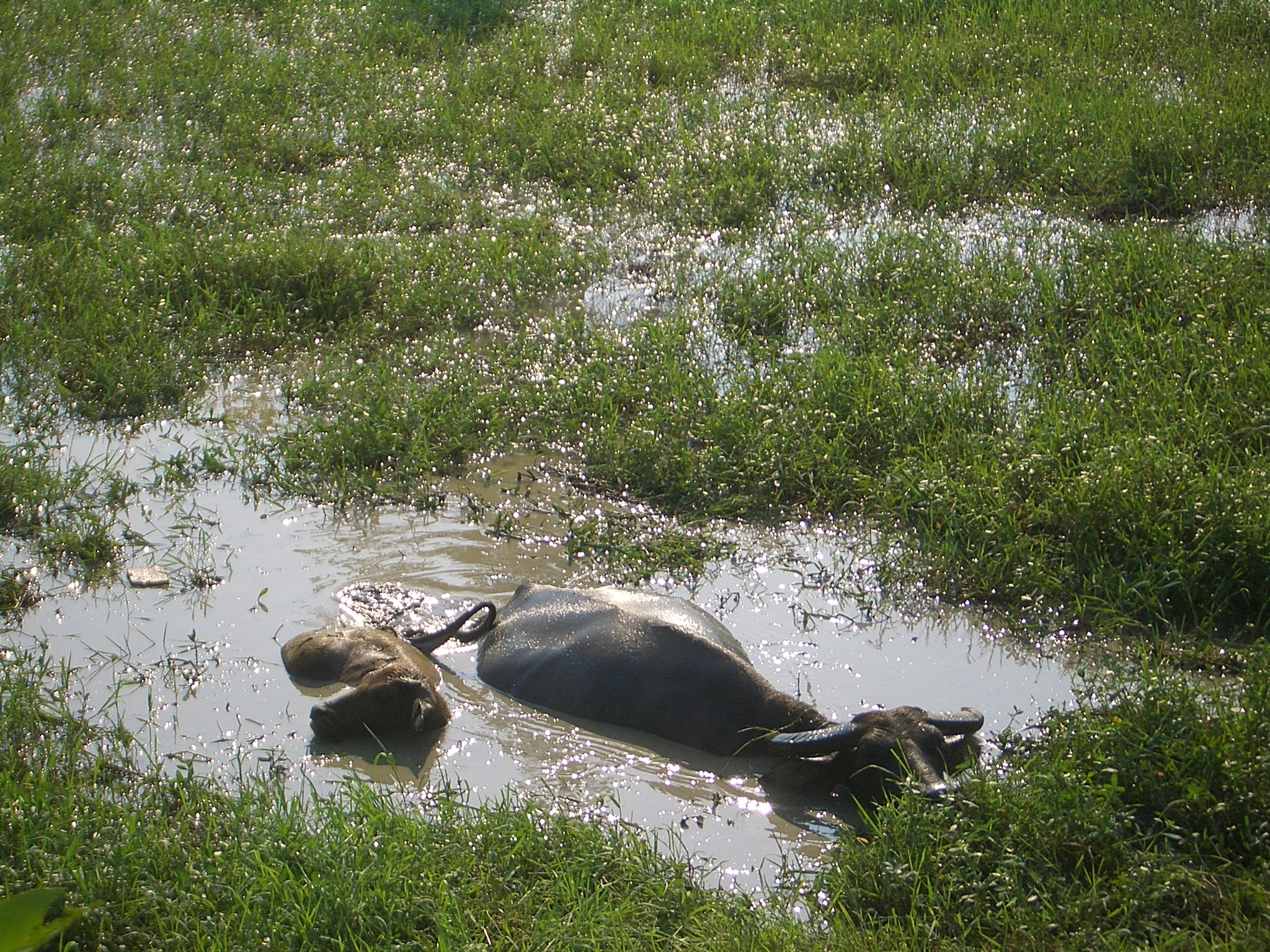
Most of Jiangxia is rural
