= Qinglongshan Ditiexiaozhen station =

Metro station in Wuhan, China

Qinglongshan Ditiexiaozhen 青龙山地铁小镇
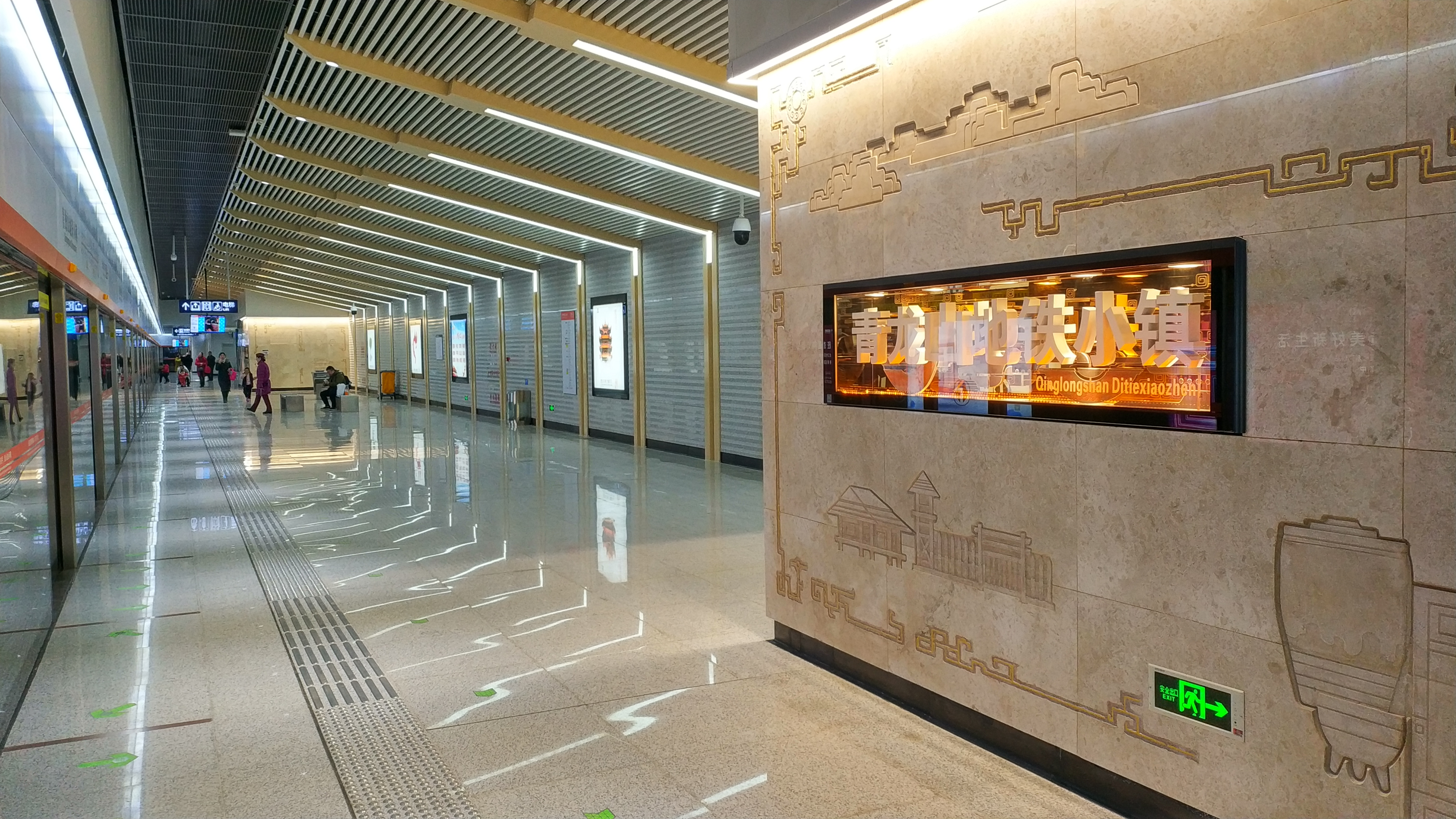

General information
- Location: Jiangxia District, Wuhan, Hubei; China
- Coordinates: 30.3201°N 114.3289°E
- Operated by: Wuhan Metro Co., Ltd
- Line: Line 7
- Platforms: 2 (2 side platforms)

Construction
- Structure type: Underground

History
- Opened: December 28, 2018 (Line 7)

Services
Preceding station	Wuhan Metro	Following station
Zhifang Avenue towards Huangpi Square	Line 7	Terminus
Location

Qinglongshan Ditiexiaozhen Station (Chinese: 青龙山地铁小镇站) is a station on Line 7 of the Wuhan Metro. It entered revenue service on December 28, 2018. It is located in Jiangxia District and it is the southern terminus of Line 7.

== Station layout ==
G	Concourse	Faregates, Station Agent
B1	Side platform, doors will open on the right
B1	Northbound	← Line 7 towards Huangpi Square (Zhifang Avenue)
B1	Southbound	Line 7 termination platform →
B1	Side platform, doors will open on the right
