= Zhang Peigang =

Chinese economist (1913–2011)

Zhang Peigang (Chinese: 张培刚; 10 July 1913 – 23 November 2011), also romanized as Chang Pei-kang, was a Chinese economist, considered a founder of development economics in the country. He was a founding professor of Huazhong University of Science and Technology and served as Honorary Dean of the School of Economics. In 1992 the university established the Zhang Peigang Development Economics Prize in his honour.

== Biography ==
Zhang was born on 10 July 1913 in Hong'an County, Hubei, Republic of China. After graduating from the Department of Economics of Wuhan University in 1934, he worked for the Institute of Social Studies of Academia Sinica, performing agricultural surveys in Hebei, Zhejiang, and Guangxi.

Zhang passed Chinese government scholarship exams for study abroad in 1940, and went to the United States to study at Harvard University the following year. He passed his master's exams in 1943 and earned his Ph.D. in economics in December 1945.

He returned to China in 1946 and served as professor and chair of the Department of Economics of Wuhan University. The economist Dong Fureng was one of his students. In 1948, Zhang was appointed counselor (the fourth-ranked official) in the Bangkok-based Asia and Far East Economic Committee of the United Nations. However, he decided to resign and return to China on the eve of the founding of the People's Republic of China in 1949.

In 1952, Zhang was appointed a member of the planning committee for the founding of Huazhong Institute of Technology (now Huazhong University of Science and Technology, HUST), and became a professor of economics when the university opened in 1953.

During the Cultural Revolution (1966–1976), Zhang was denounced as a "reactionary academic authority" and forced to perform hard labour. His large collection of foreign books and documents was destroyed. After the end of the Cultural Revolution, he was rehabilitated and later served as Honorary Dean of the School of Economics and Director of the Research Center of Economic Development at HUST.

Zhang died at Wuhan Union Hospital on 23 November 2011, aged 98. He had been scheduled to receive the Lifetime Achievement Award of HUST on the day he died.

== Contributions ==
Zhang's 70 years of academic career was closely connected with the emergence and evolution of development economics. His doctoral dissertation, entitled Agriculture and Industrialization: The Adjustment That Takes Place as an Agricultural Country Is Industrialized, was awarded the David A. Wells Prize for 1946–1947 by Harvard University. It was published in 1949 in the journal Harvard Economic Studies (Volume 85). In 1951, it was translated into Spanish and published in Mexico. The Spanish translation was adopted as a textbook by several Latin American universities in the 1950s; it was first published in Chinese in 1984.

Zhang's dissertation was one of the foundational works of early stage development economics. It put forward the theories of the industrialization of agricultural countries systematically, and focused on three main factors of the dynamic relationship between agriculture and industry: food, raw materials, and labor, with detailed arguments. As such, Zhang is considered a pioneer in development economics and a founder of the discipline in China.

In 1992, Huazhong University of Science and Technology established the Zhang Peigang Development Economics Prize to reward economists who have made outstanding contributions to the field. Recipients of the prize include Justin Yifu Lin and Wu Jinglian.
