= Sanyang Road station =

Wuhan Metro station

Sanyang Road 三阳路 metro
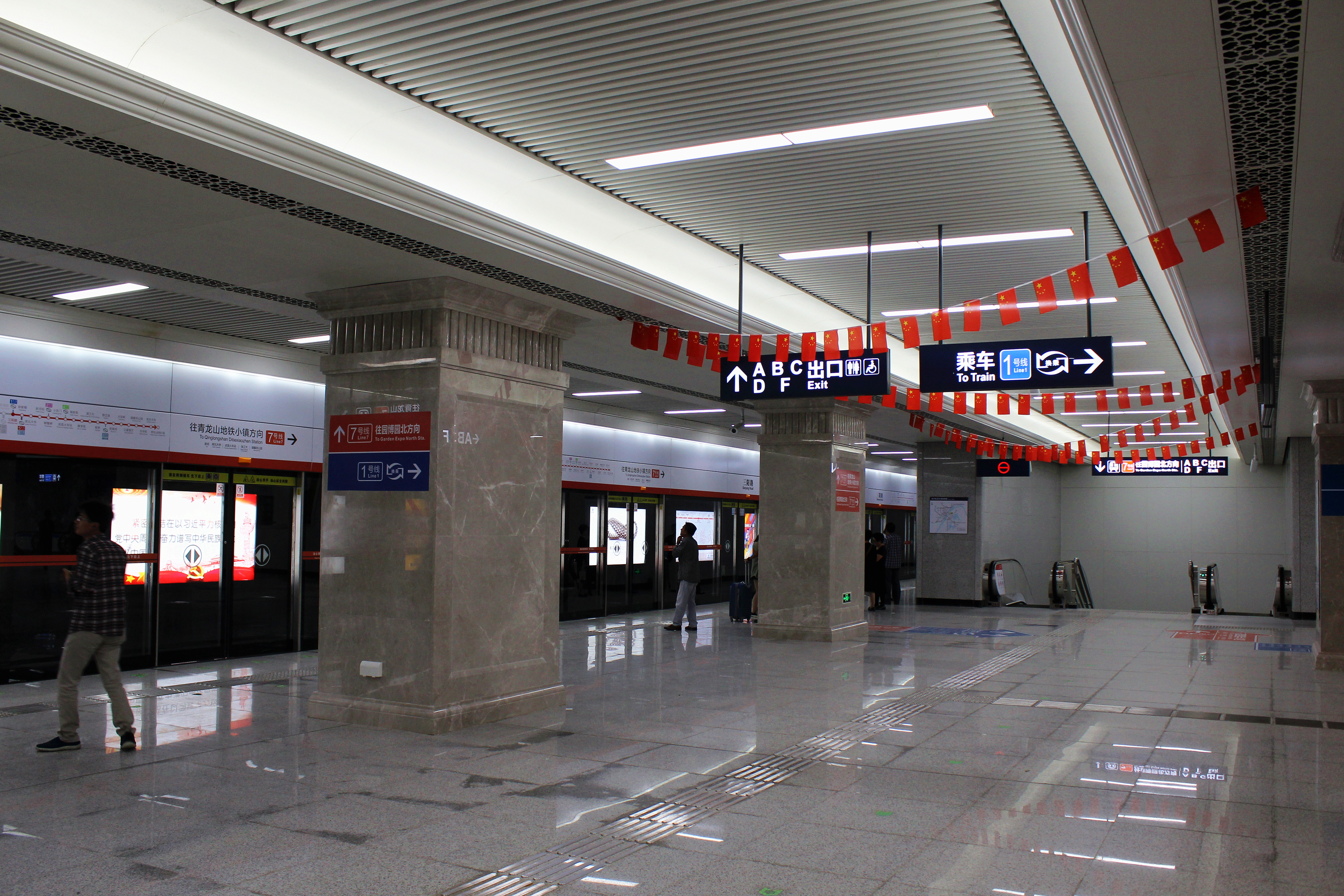
- Line 7 platforms at Sanyang Road station

General information
- Location: Jiang'an District, Wuhan, Hubei; China
- Coordinates: 30°35′52″N 114°18′06″E
- Operated by: Wuhan Metro Co., Ltd
- Lines: Line 1; Line 7
- Platforms: 4 (4 side platforms)

History
- Opened: July 28, 2004; 21 years ago

Services
Preceding station	Wuhan Metro	Following station
Dazhi Road towards Jinghe	Line 1	Huangpu Road towards Hankou North
Xianggang Road towards Huangpi Square	Line 7	Xujiapeng towards Qinglongshan Ditiexiaozhen
Location

Sanyang Road Station (simplified Chinese: 三阳路; traditional Chinese: 三陽路; pinyin: sān yáng lù) serves as an interchange station of Line 1 and Line 7 of Wuhan Metro. The elevated station entered revenue service along with the completion of Line 1, Phase 1 on July 28, 2004, and the underground station entered service on October 1, 2018 with the opening of Line 7.

== Station layout ==
3F	Side platform, doors open on the right
3F	Westbound	← Line 1 towards Jinghe (Dazhi Road)
3F	Eastbound	Line 1 towards Hankou North (Huangpu Road) →
3F	Side platform, doors open on the right
2F	Concourse	Faregates, station agent
G	Entrances and exits	Exits A-H, J-L
B1	Concourse	Faregates, station agent
B2	Side platform, doors open on the right
B2	Northbound	← Line 7 towards Huangpi Square (Xianggang Road)
B2	Southbound	Line 7 towards Qinglongshan Ditiexiaozhen (Xujiapeng) →
B2	Side platform, doors open on the right
B3		Transfer passage

== Facilities ==
Sanyang Road Station for Line 1 is a two-story elevated station placed along Jinghan Avenue. The station has two side platforms accommodating a pair of tracks, and is equipped with attended customer service concierges, automatic ticket vending machines, and accessible ramps. The underground Line 7 station has a two side platforms and is connected to the elevated portion with two pairs of escalators, and a connecting bridge over the Sanyang Road intersection on both sides of the Jinghan Avenue.

== Exits ==
There are sixteen exits in service:

- Exit A: Northwestern side of Jinghan Avenue.
- Exit B: Southeastern side of Jinghan Avenue.
- Exit C1
- Exit C2
- Exit D
- Exit E
- Exit F
- Exit G
- Exit H
- Exit J
- Exit K1
- Exit K2
- Exit L1
- Exit L2
- Exit L3
- Exit L4

== Transfers ==
Bus transfers to Route 502, 534, 559, 581, 598, 608, 622, 711 and 801 are available at Sanyang Road Station.
