= Fanhu station =

Wuhan Metro station

Fanhu 范湖
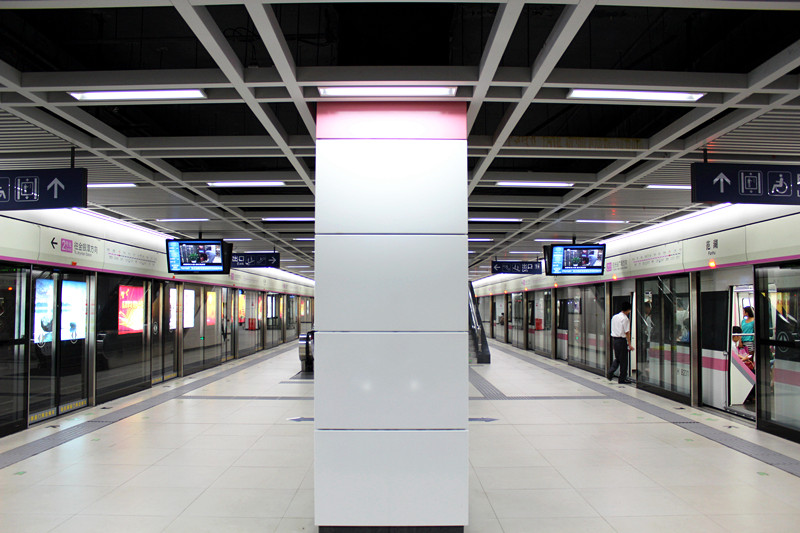

General information
- Location: Jianghan District, Wuhan, Hubei; China
- Coordinates: 30°36′36″N 114°15′14″E
- Operated by: Wuhan Metro Co., Ltd
- Lines: Line 2; Line 3
- Platforms: 4 (2 island platforms)

Construction
- Structure type: Underground

History
- Opened: December 28, 2012 (Line 2); December 28, 2015 (Line 3)

Services
Preceding station	Wuhan Metro	Following station
Hankou Railway Station towards Tianhe International Airport	Line 2	Wangjiadun East towards Fozuling
Lingjiaohu towards Hongtu Boulevard	Line 3	Yunfei Road towards Zhuanyang Boulevard
Location

Fanhu Station (Chinese: 范湖站) is an interchange station of Line 2 and Line 3 of the Wuhan Metro. It entered revenue service on December 28, 2012. It is located in Jianghan District. The Line 3 station platforms opened on December 28, 2015.

== Station layout ==
G	Entrances and Exits	Exits A-E, H, J
B1	Concourse	Faregates, Station Agent
B2	Northbound	← Line 2 towards Tianhe International Airport (Hankou Railway Station)
B2	Island platform, doors will open on the left
B2	Southbound	Line 2 towards Fozuling (Wangjiadun East) →
B3	Northbound	← Line 3 towards Hongtu Boulevard (Lingjiaohu)
B3	Island platform, doors will open on the left
B3	Southbound	Line 3 towards Zhuanyang Boulevard (Yunfei Road) →

== Gallery ==
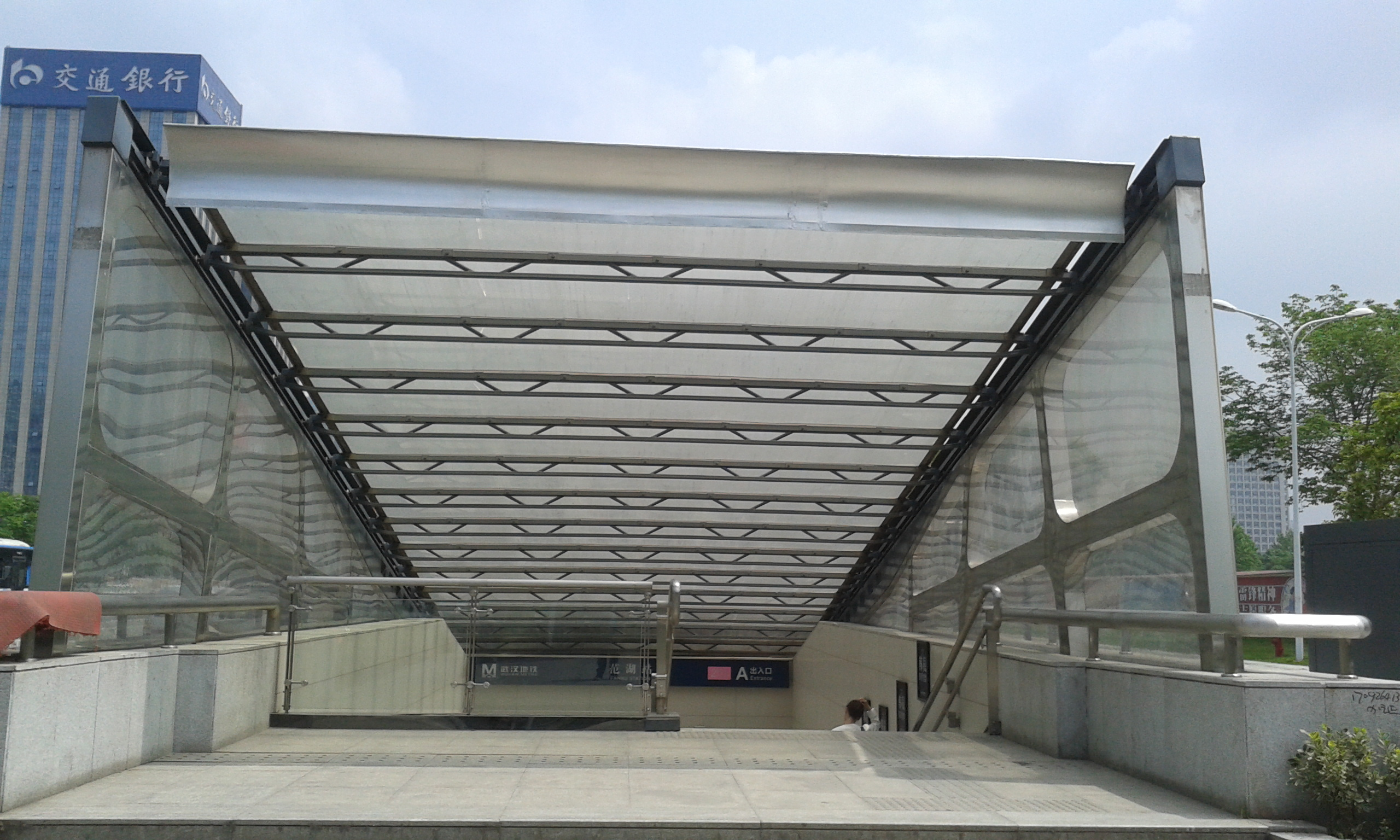
Entrance A

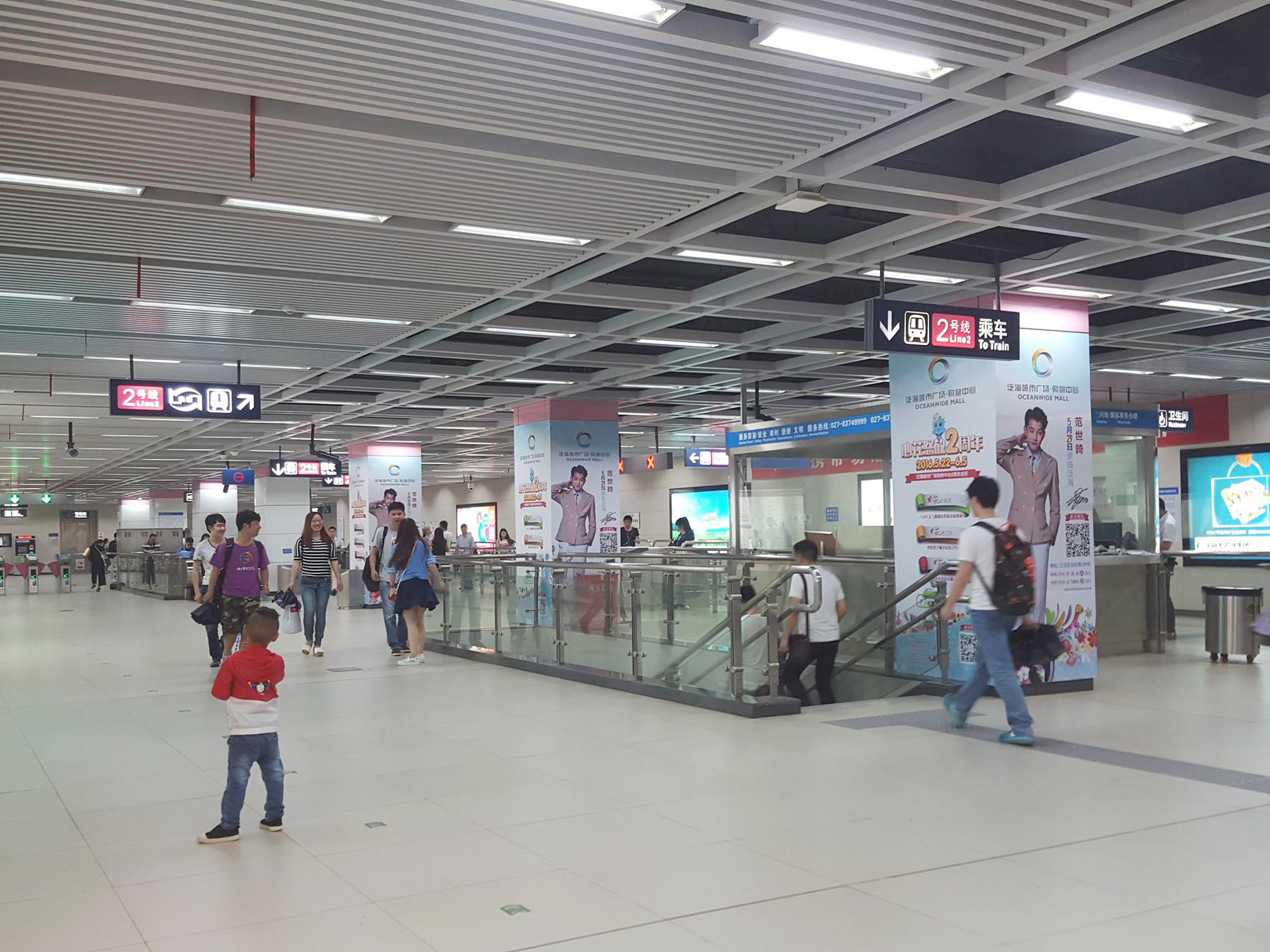
Concourse

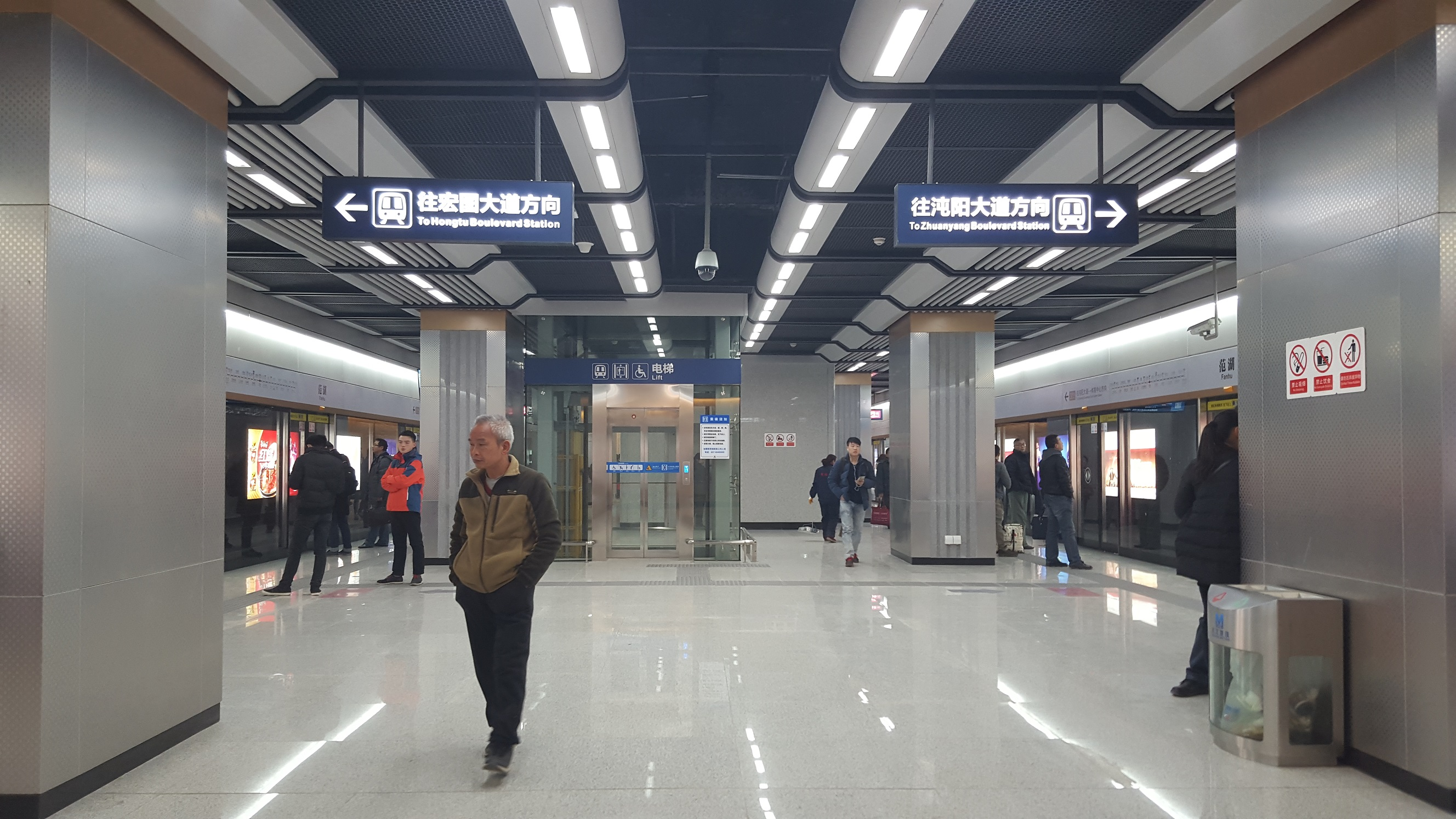
Line 3 platform
