= Xianggang Road station =

Metro station in Wuhan, China

Xianggang Road 香港路
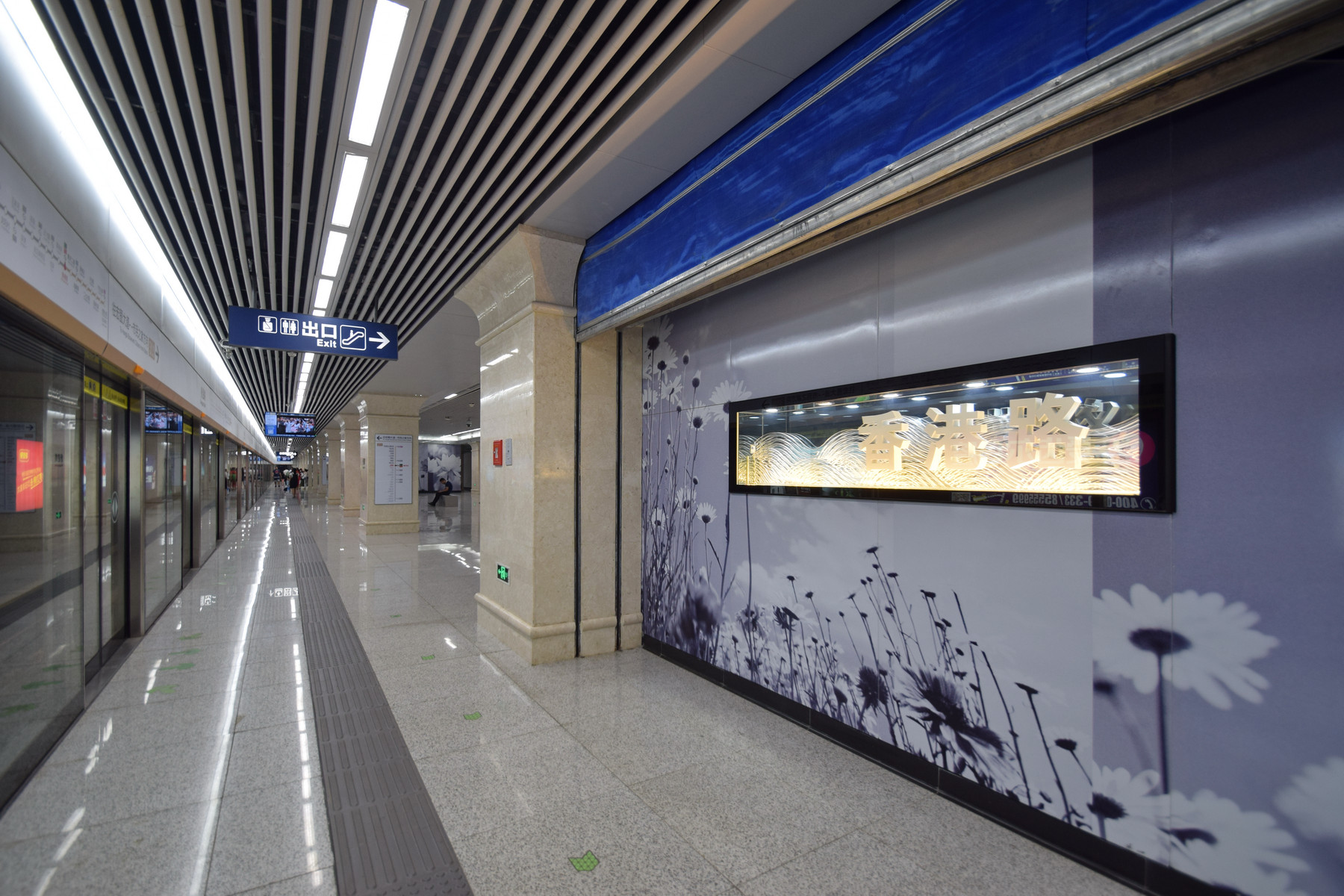

General information
- Location: Jiang'an District, Wuhan, Hubei; China
- Coordinates: 30.6077°N 114.27926°E
- Operated by: Wuhan Metro Co., Ltd
- Lines: Line 3; Line 6; Line 7
- Platforms: 6 (2 side platforms, 2 island platforms)

Construction
- Structure type: Underground

History
- Opened: December 28, 2015 (Line 3); December 28, 2016 (Line 6); October 1, 2018 (Line 7)

Services
Preceding station	Wuhan Metro	Following station
Huiji 2nd Road towards Hongtu Boulevard	Line 3	Lingjiaohu towards Zhuanyang Boulevard
Sanyanqiao towards Xincheng 11th Road	Line 6	Miaoli Road towards Dongfeng Motor Corporation
Qushuilou towards Huangpi Square	Line 7	Sanyang Road towards Qinglongshan Ditiexiaozhen
Location

Xianggang Road (Chinese: 香港路站) is a transfer station on the Wuhan Metro. It entered revenue service on December 28, 2015. It is located in Jiang'an District. This station is an interchange between Line 3, Line 6 and Line 7.

== Station layout ==
G	Entrances and Exits	Exits A, B, D-H
B1	Concourse	Faregates, Station Agent
B2		Transfer Corridor
B2	Side platform, doors will open on the right
B2	Northbound	← Line 6 towards Xincheng 11th Road (Sanyanqiao)
B2	Southbound	Line 6 towards Dongfeng Motor Corporation (Miaoli Road)	→
B2	Side platform, doors will open on the right
B2		Transfer Corridor
B3	Southbound	← Line 3 towards Zhuanyang Boulevard (Lingjiaohu)
B3	Island platform, doors will open on the left/right
B3	Northbound	← Line 7 towards Huangpi Square (Qushuilou)
B4	Northbound	Line 3 towards Hongtu Boulevard (Huiji 2nd Road) →
B4	Island platform, doors will open on the left/right
B4	Southbound	Line 7 towards Qinglongshan Ditiexiaozhen (Sanyang Road)	→

== Gallery ==
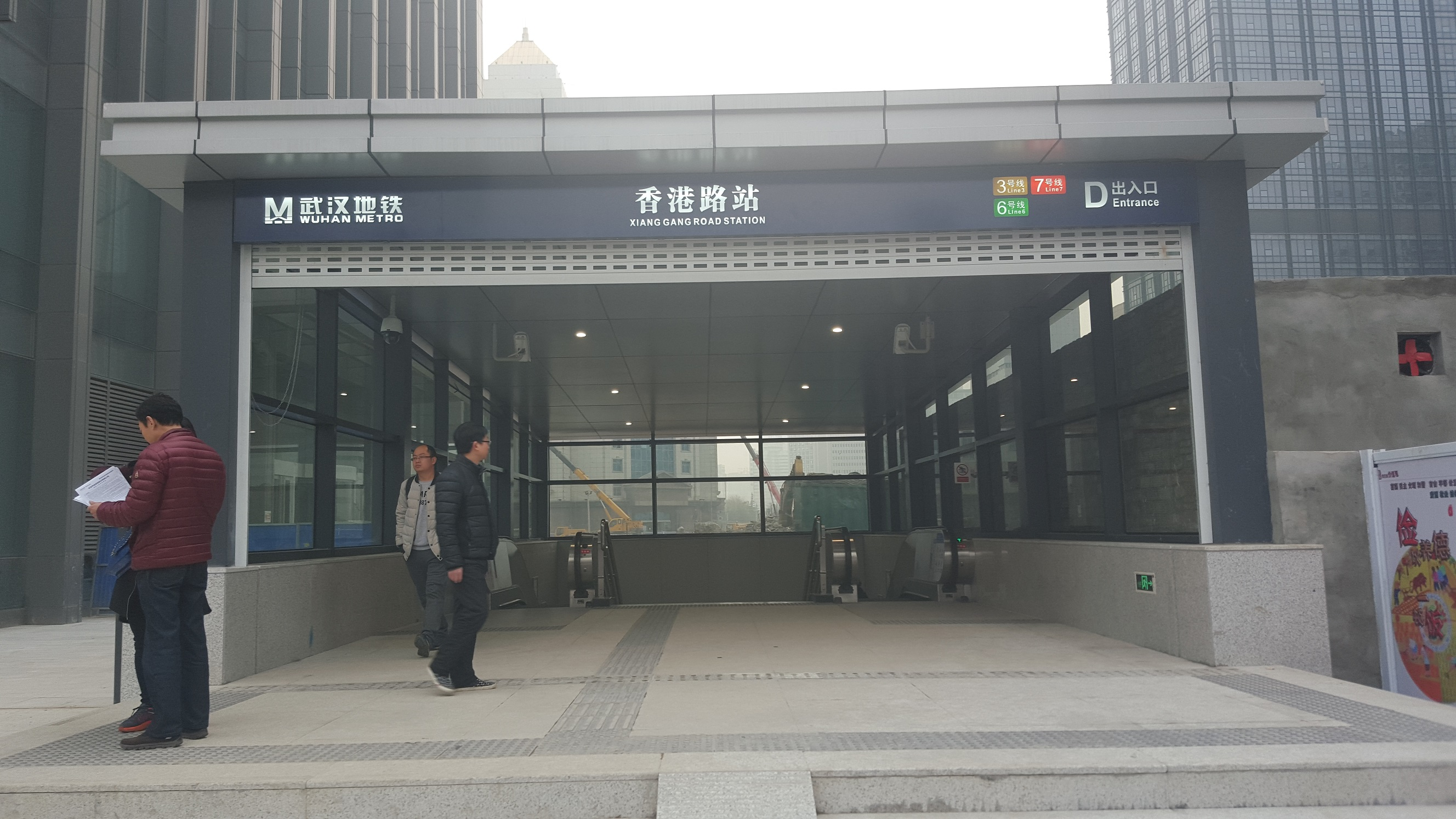
Entrance D

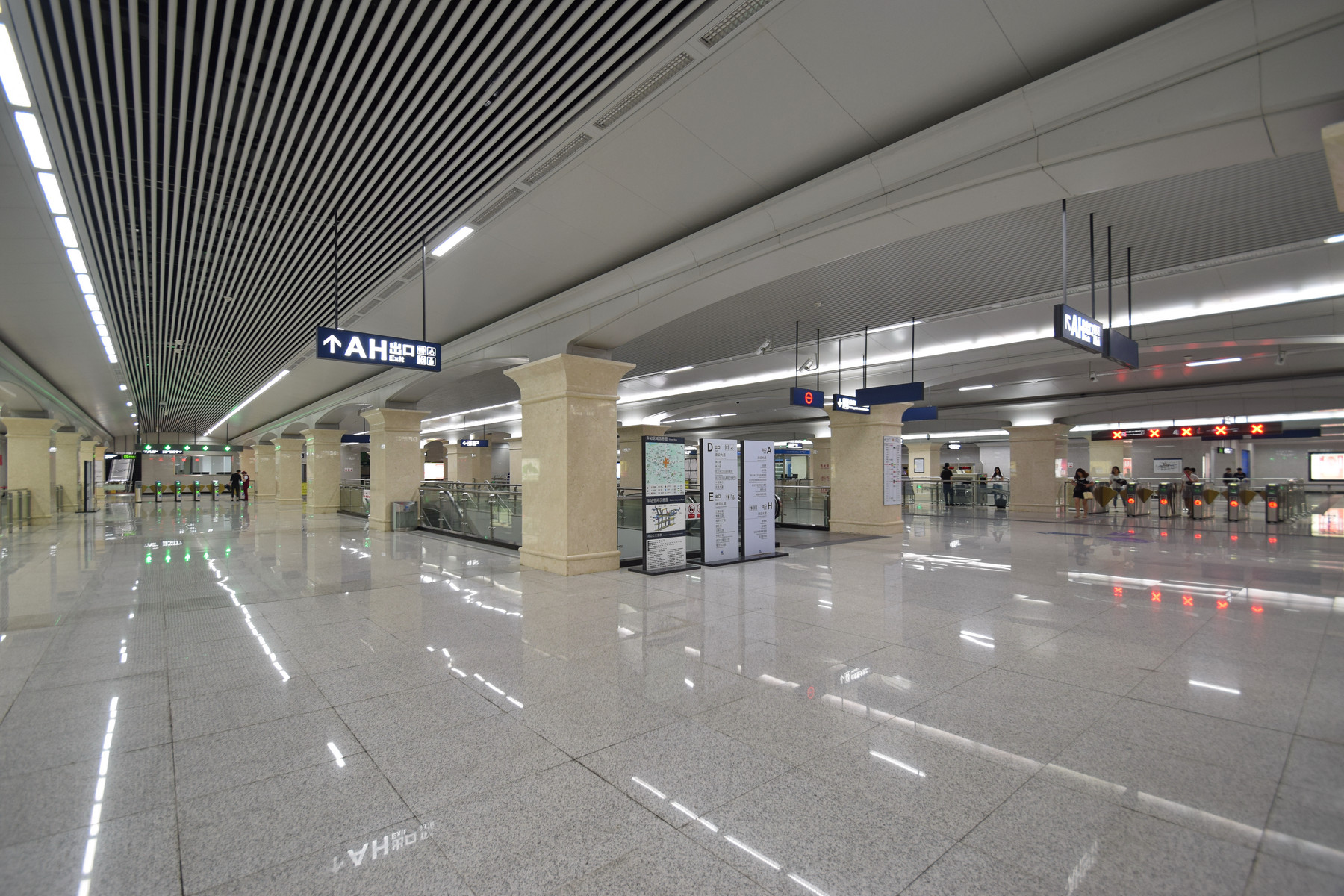
Concourse

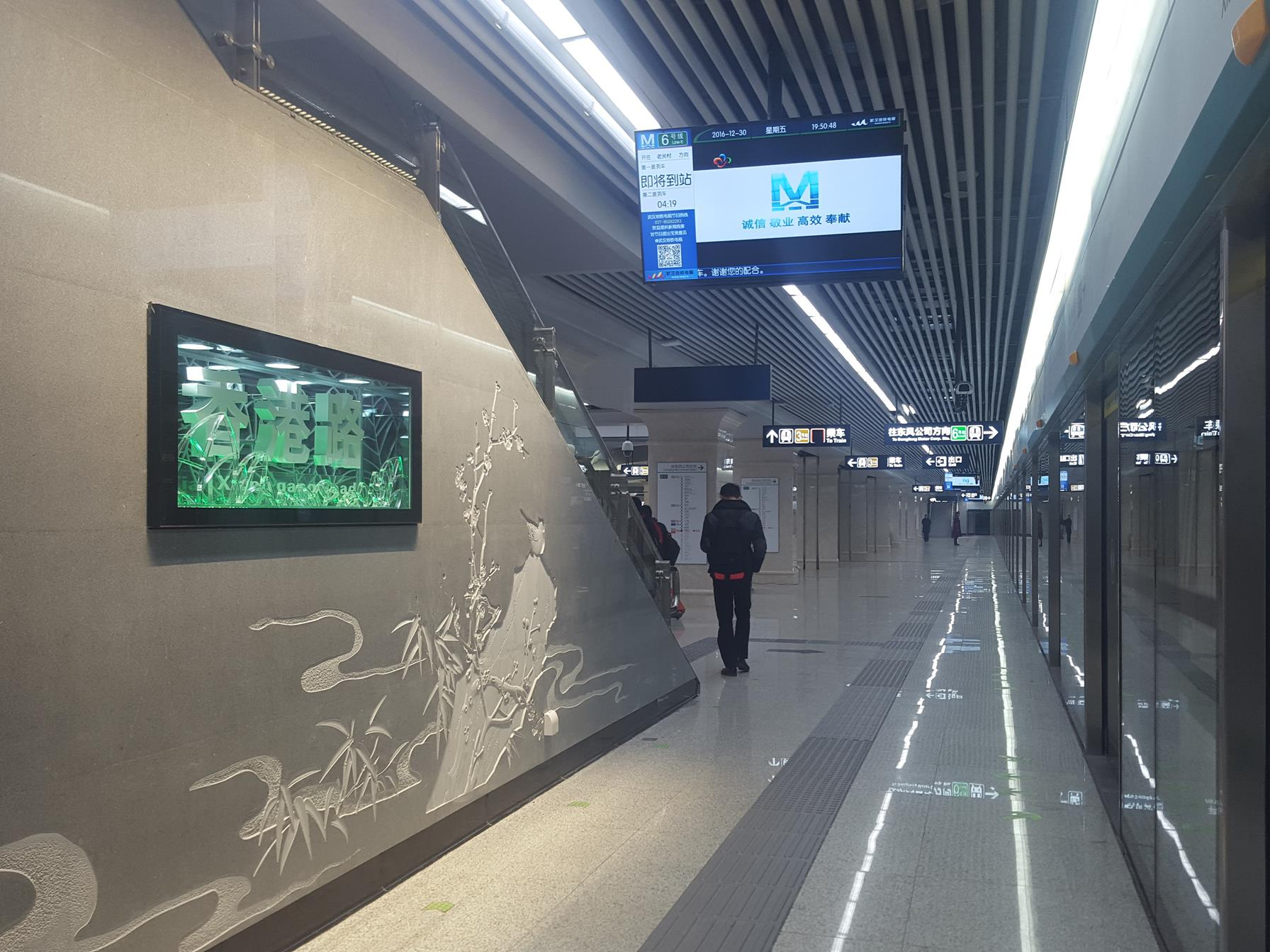
Line 6 platform

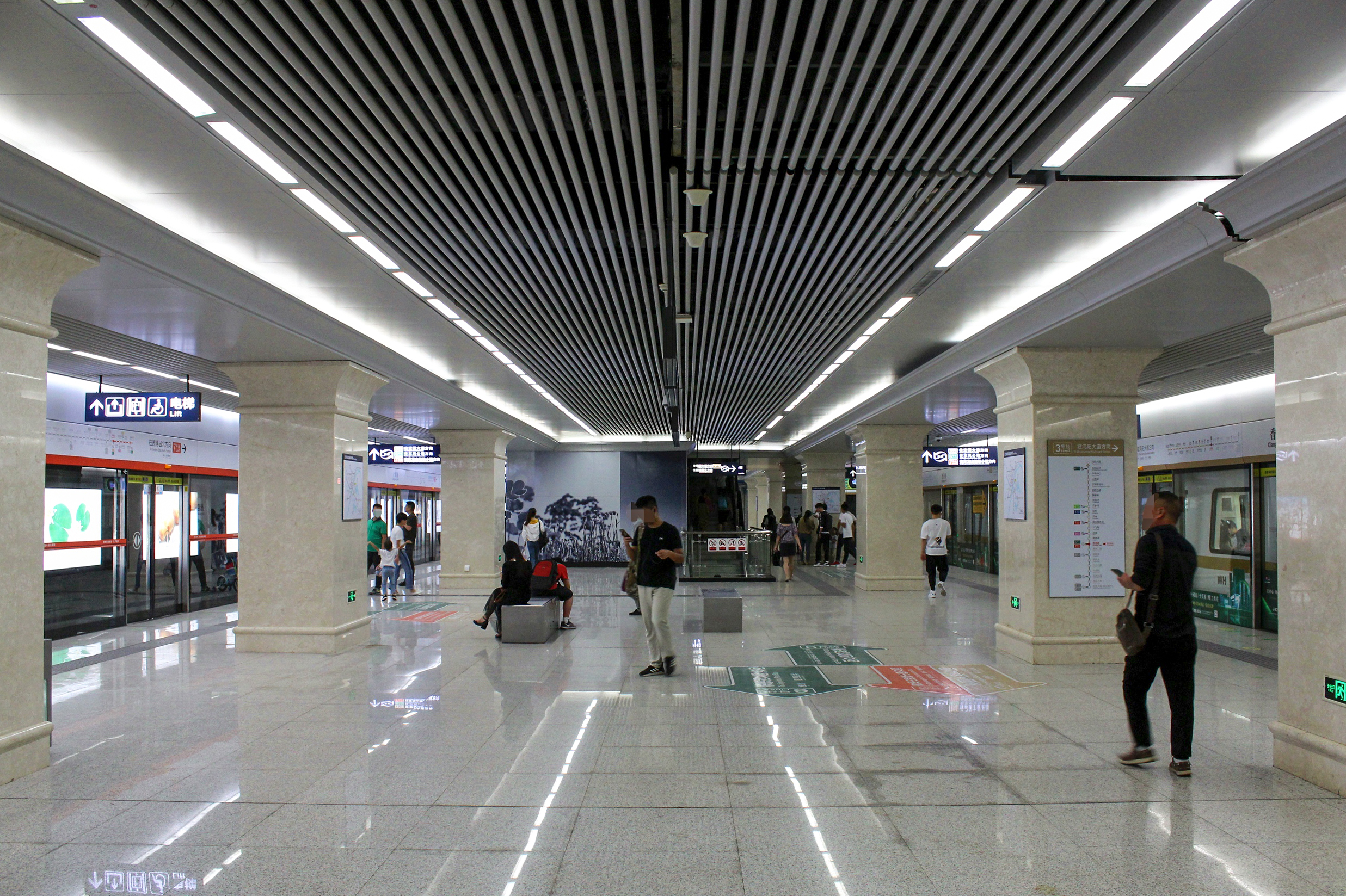
Line 3 & 7 platform
