= Miaoli Road station =

Metro station in Wuhan, China

Miaoli Road 苗栗路

General information
- Location: Jiang'an District, Wuhan, Hubei; China
- Operated by: Wuhan Metro Co., Ltd
- Line: Line 6
- Platforms: 2 (1 island platform)

Construction
- Structure type: Underground

History
- Opened: December 28, 2016 (Line 6)

Services
Preceding station	Wuhan Metro	Following station
Xianggang Road towards Xincheng 11th Road	Line 6	Dazhi Road towards Dongfeng Motor Corporation
Location

Miaoli Road Station (Chinese: 苗栗路站) is a station on Line 6 of the Wuhan Metro. It entered revenue service on December 28, 2016. It is located in Jiang'an District.

== Station layout ==
G	Entrances and Exits	Exits A-D
B1	Concourse	Faregates, Station Agent
B2	Northbound	← Line 6 towards Xincheng 11th Road (Xianggang Road)
B2	Island platform, doors will open on the left
B2	Southbound	Line 6 towards Dongfeng Motor Corporation (Dazhi Road) →
