= Zhongshan Park station (Wuhan Metro) =

Wuhan Metro station

Zhongshan Park 中山公园 metro
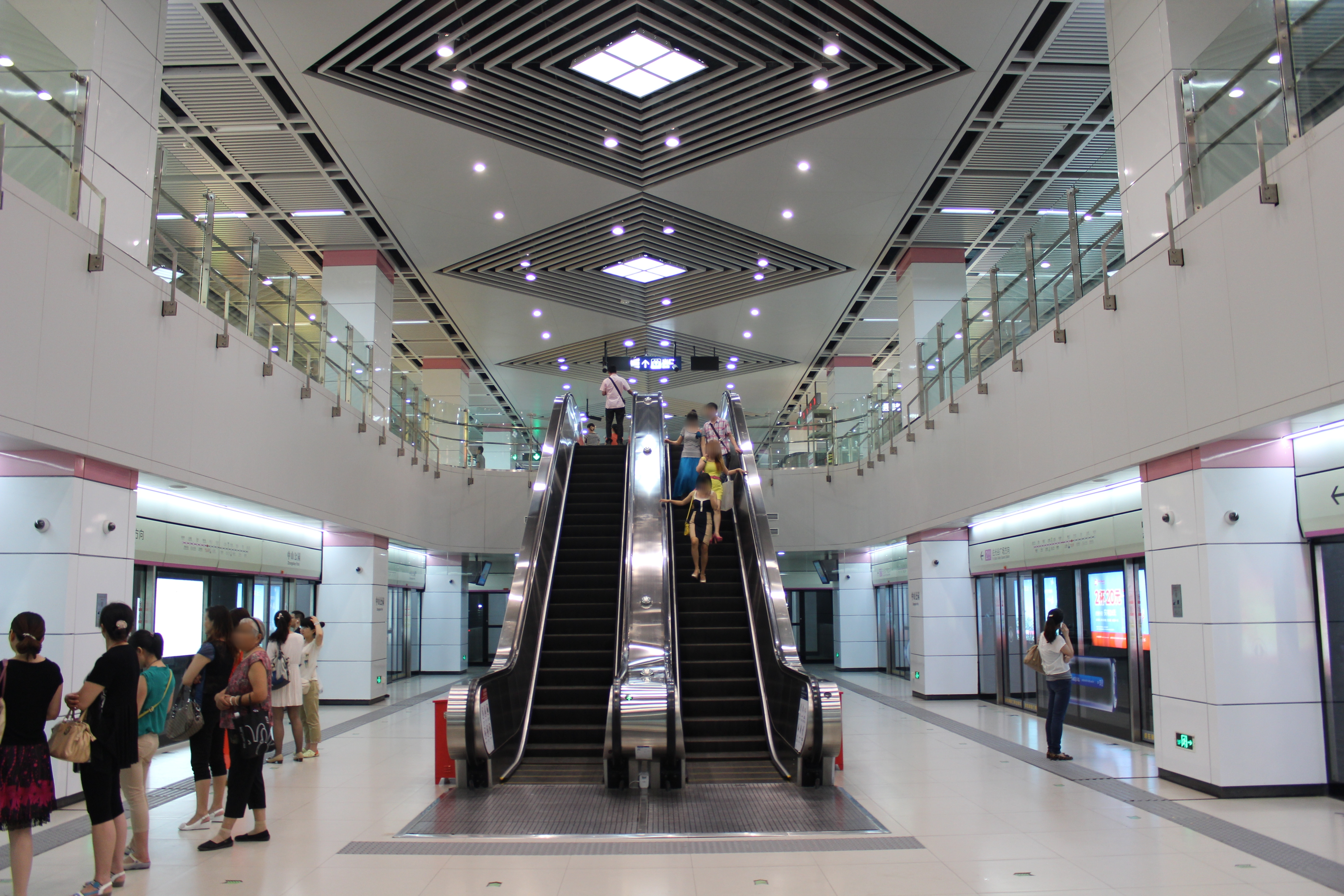

General information
- Location: Jianghan District, Wuhan, Hubei; China
- Coordinates: 30°35′07″N 114°16′13″E
- Operated by: Wuhan Metro Co., Ltd
- Line: Line 2
- Platforms: 2 (1 island platform)

Construction
- Structure type: Underground

History
- Opened: December 28, 2012 (Line 2)

Services
Preceding station	Wuhan Metro	Following station
Qingnian Road towards Tianhe International Airport	Line 2	Xunlimen towards Fozuling
Location

Zhongshan Park Station (Chinese: 中山公园站) is a station of Line 2 of Wuhan Metro. It entered revenue service on December 28, 2012. It is located in Jianghan District.

== Station layout ==
G	Entrances and Exits	Exits A-E
B1	Concourse	Faregates, Station Agent
B2	Northbound	← Line 2 towards Tianhe International Airport (Qingnian Road)
B2	Island platform, doors will open on the left
B2	Southbound	Line 2 towards Fozuling (Xunlimen) →

== Gallery ==
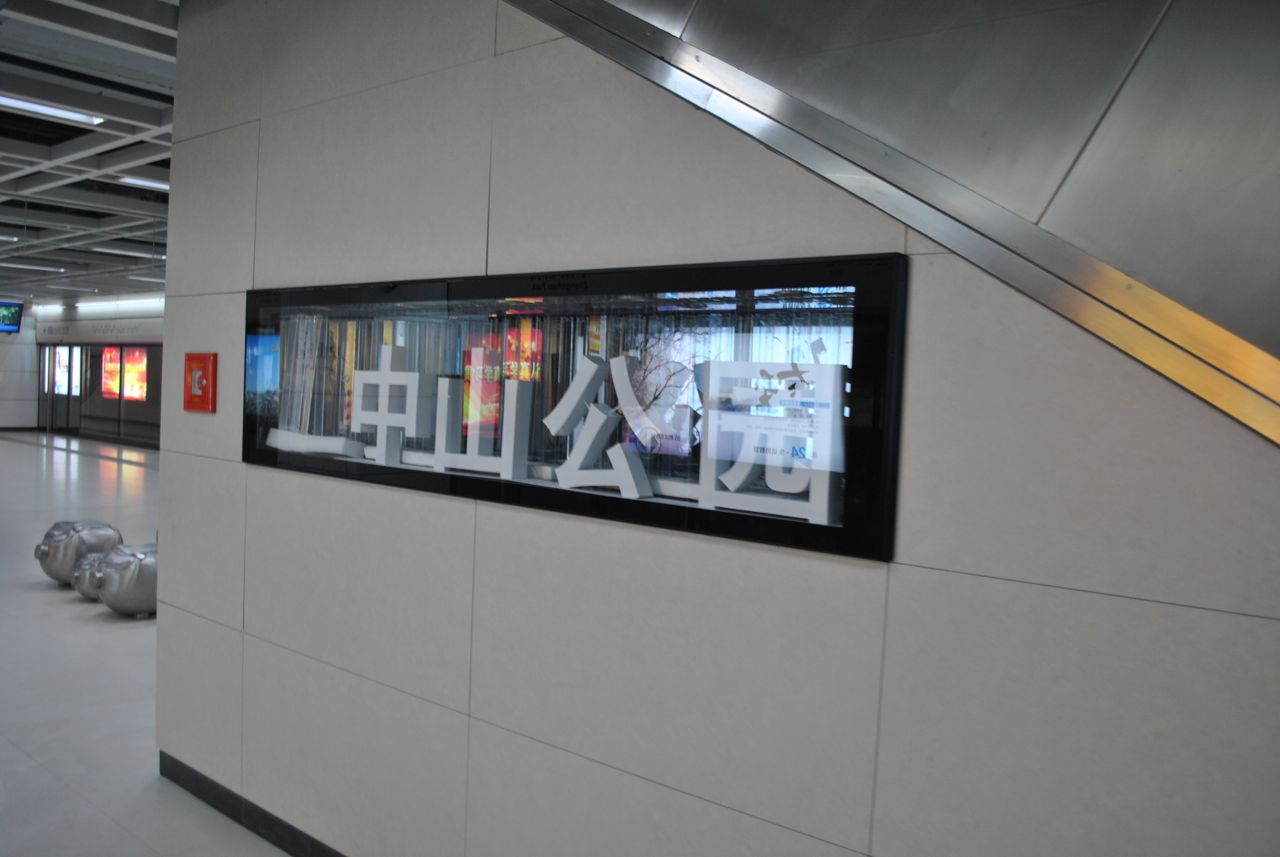
3D Station Name

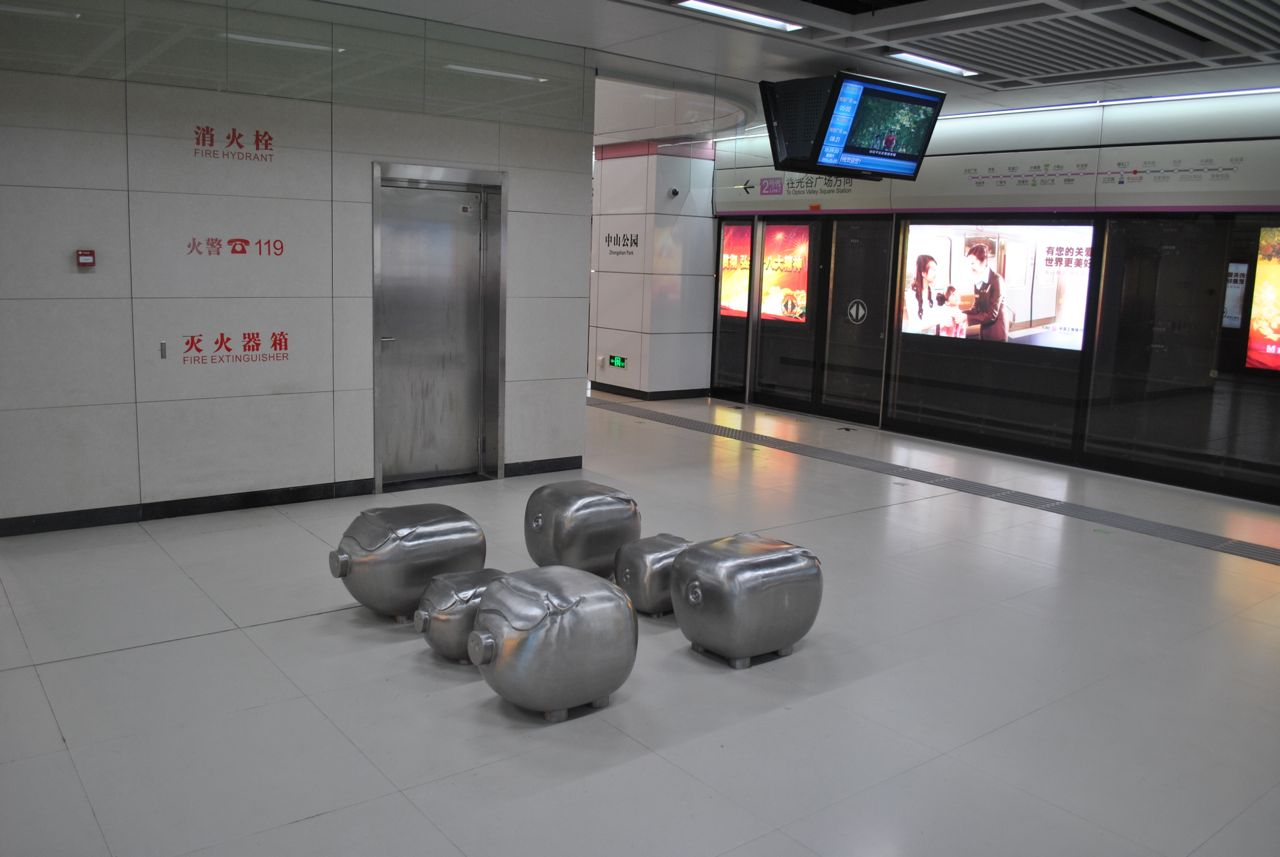
Desk

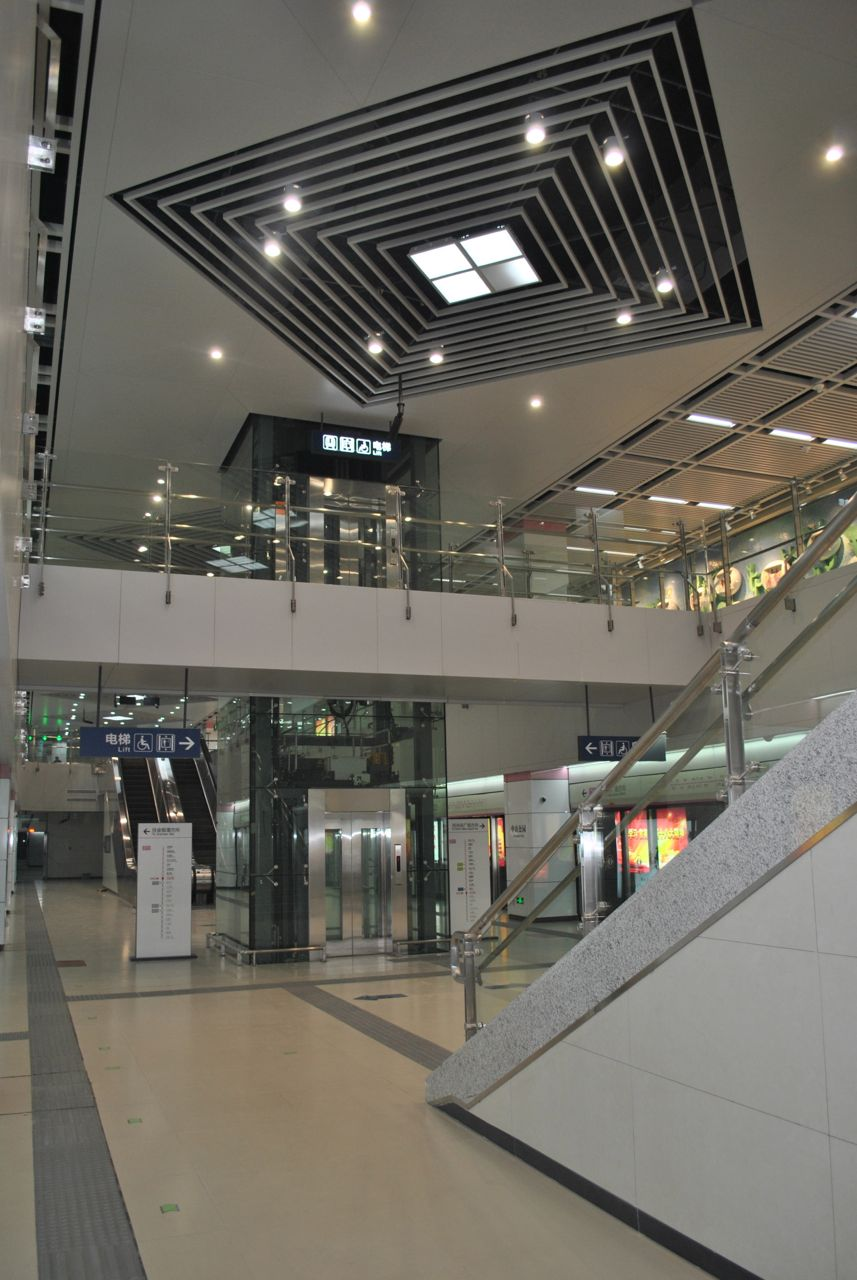
Station hall

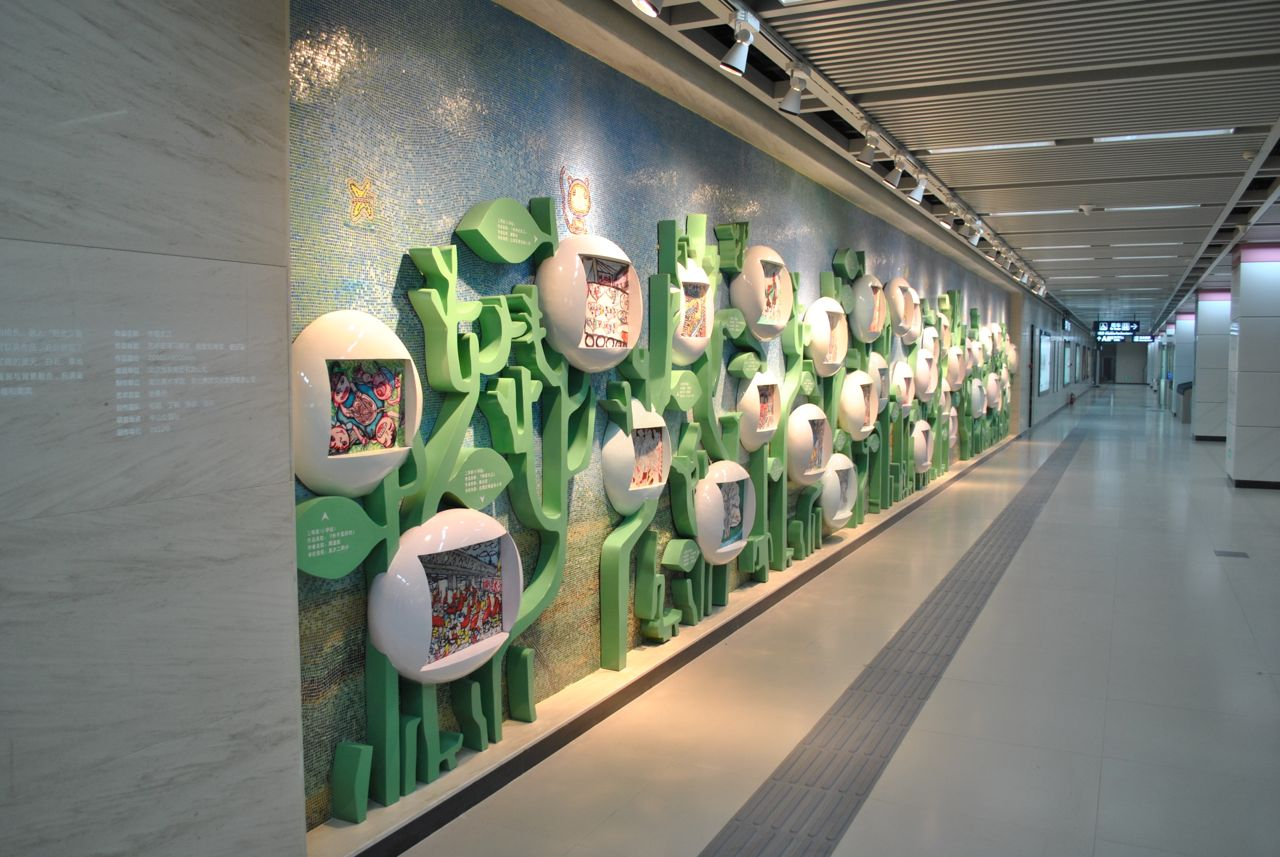
Wall

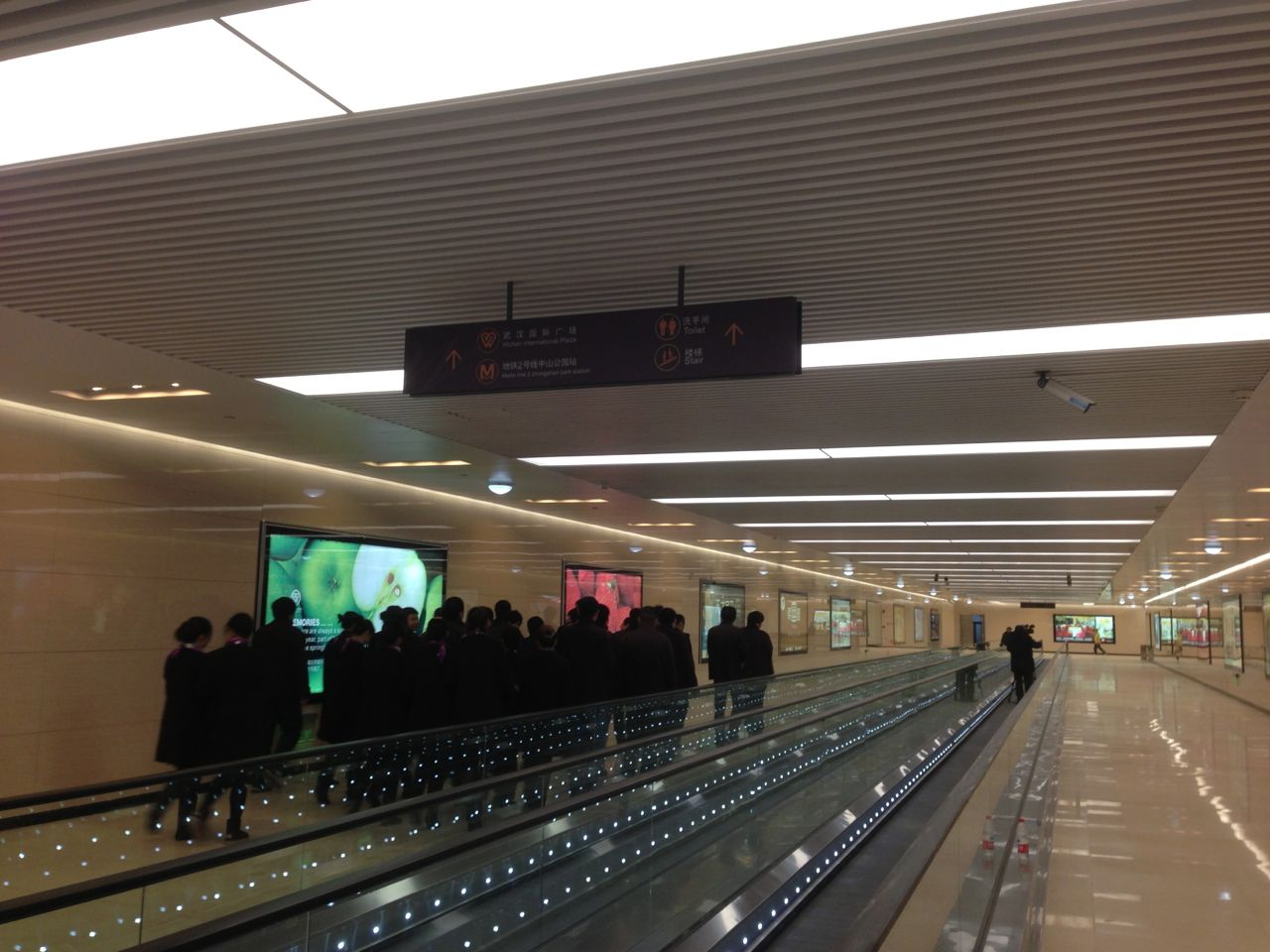
Automatic Sidewalk

=== Entrance ===
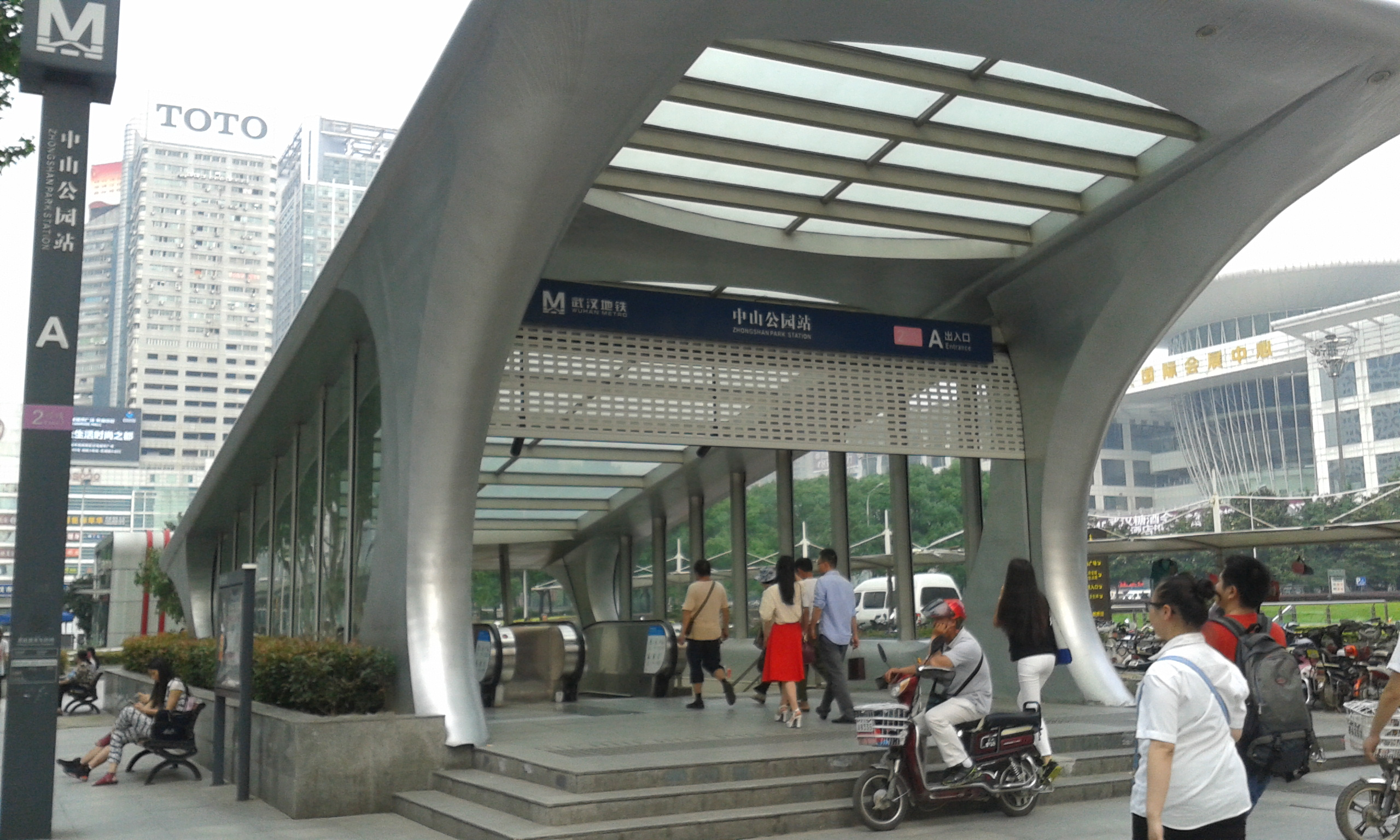
Entrance A

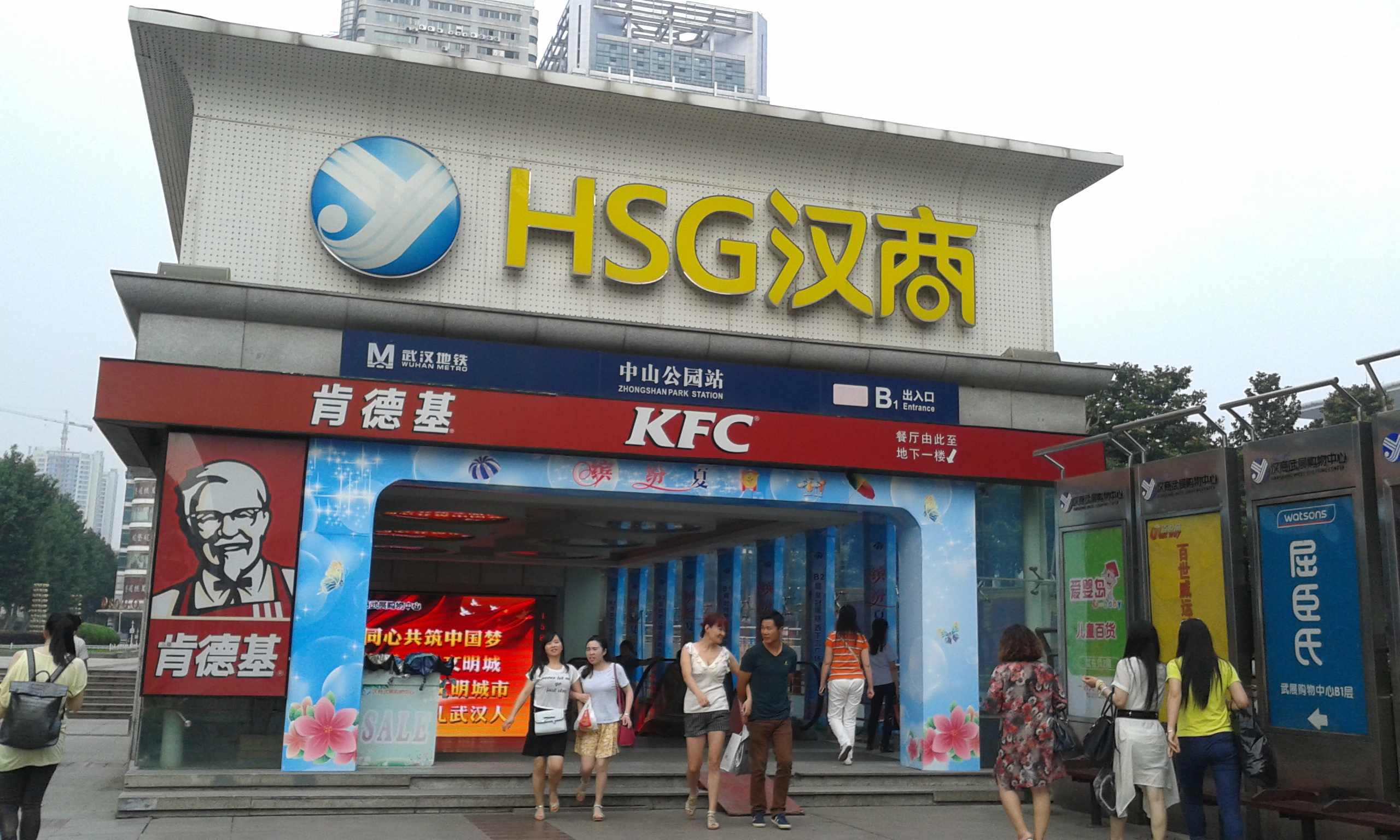
Entrance B1

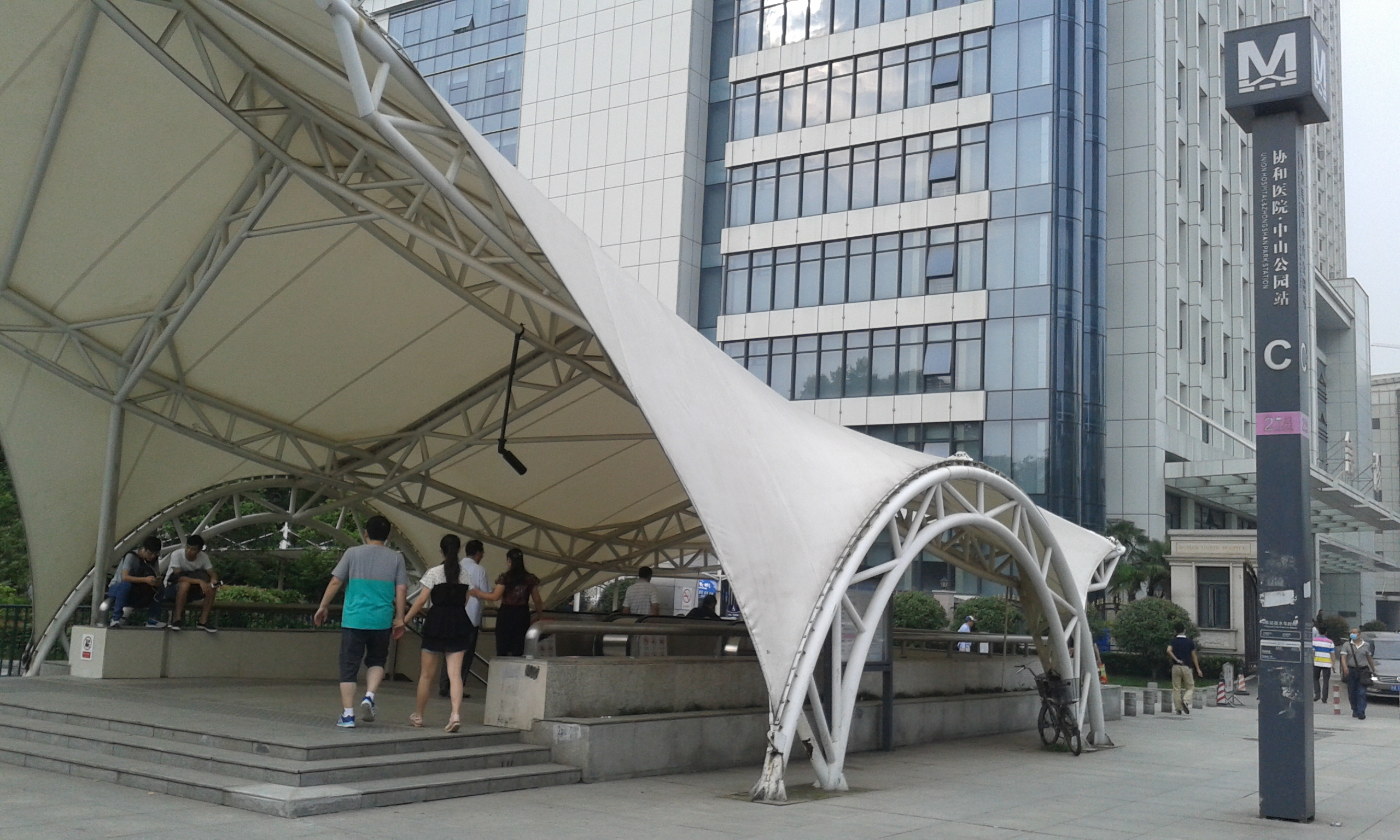
Entrance C

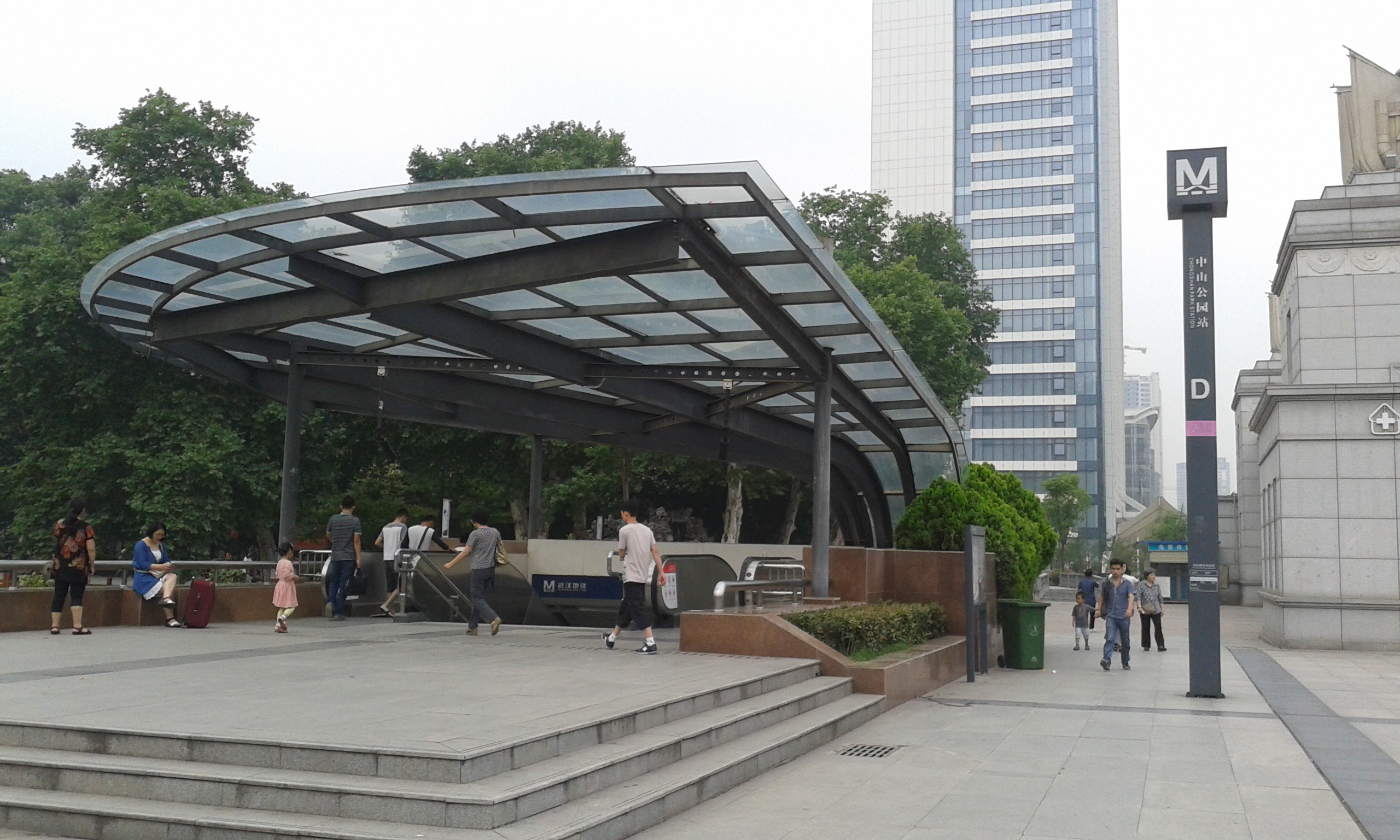
Entrance D

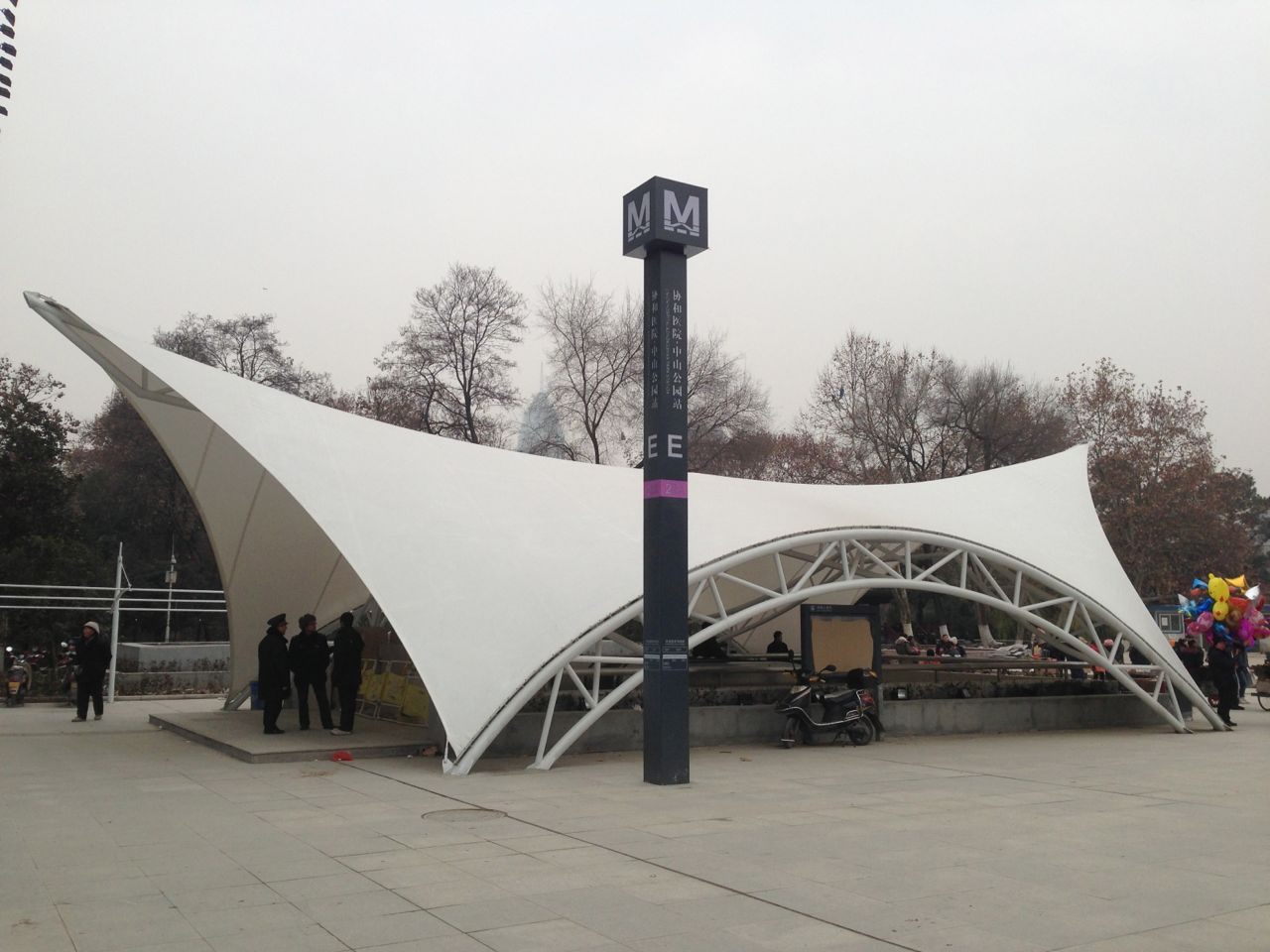
Entrance E

== Transfers ==
Bus transfers to Route 1, 42, 64, 548, 549, 571, 592, 705, 712, 721, 726, 802, 808 and T3 are available at Zhongshan Park Station.

== Around the station ==
- Wuhan Union Hospital
