= Qushuilou station =

Metro station in Wuhan, China

Qushuilou 取水楼 metro
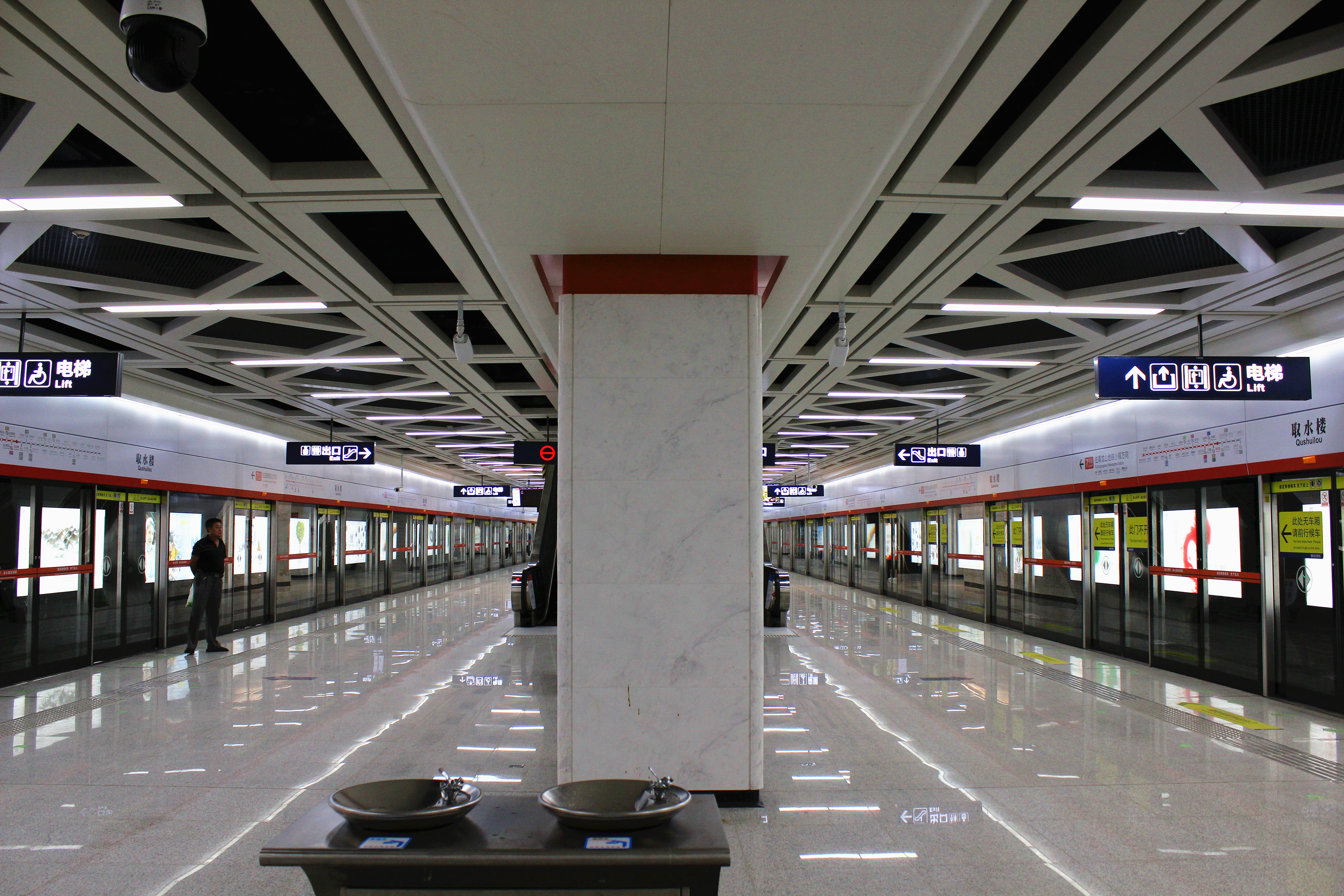

General information
- Location: Jianghan District, Wuhan, Hubei; China
- Coordinates: 30.59962°N 114.2681°E
- Operated by: Wuhan Metro Co., Ltd
- Line: Line 7
- Platforms: 2 (1 island platform)

Construction
- Structure type: Underground

History
- Opened: October 1, 2018 (Line 7)

Services
Preceding station	Wuhan Metro	Following station
Wangjiadun East towards Huangpi Square	Line 7	Xianggang Road towards Qinglongshan Ditiexiaozhen
Location

Qushuilou Station (Chinese: 取水楼站) is a station on Line 7 of the Wuhan Metro. It entered revenue service on October 1, 2018. It is located in Jianghan District.

== Station layout ==
G	Entrances and Exits	Exits A-H, J, K
B1	Concourse	Faregates, Station Agent
B2	Northbound	← Line 7 towards Huangpi Square (Wangjiadun East)
B2	Island platform, doors will open on the left
B2	Southbound	Line 7 towards Qinglongshan Ditiexiaozhen (Xianggang Road) →

== Gallery ==
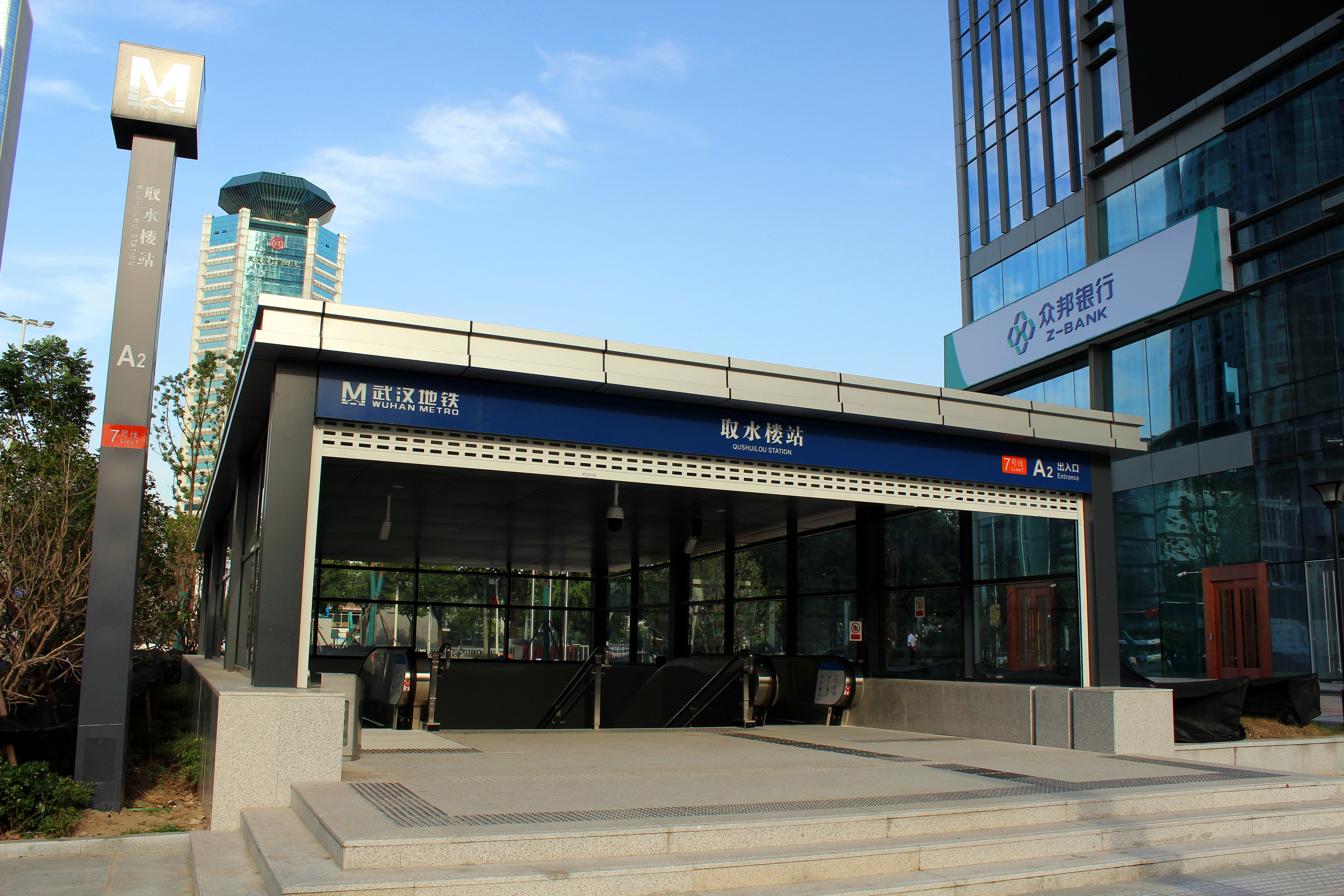
Entrance A2

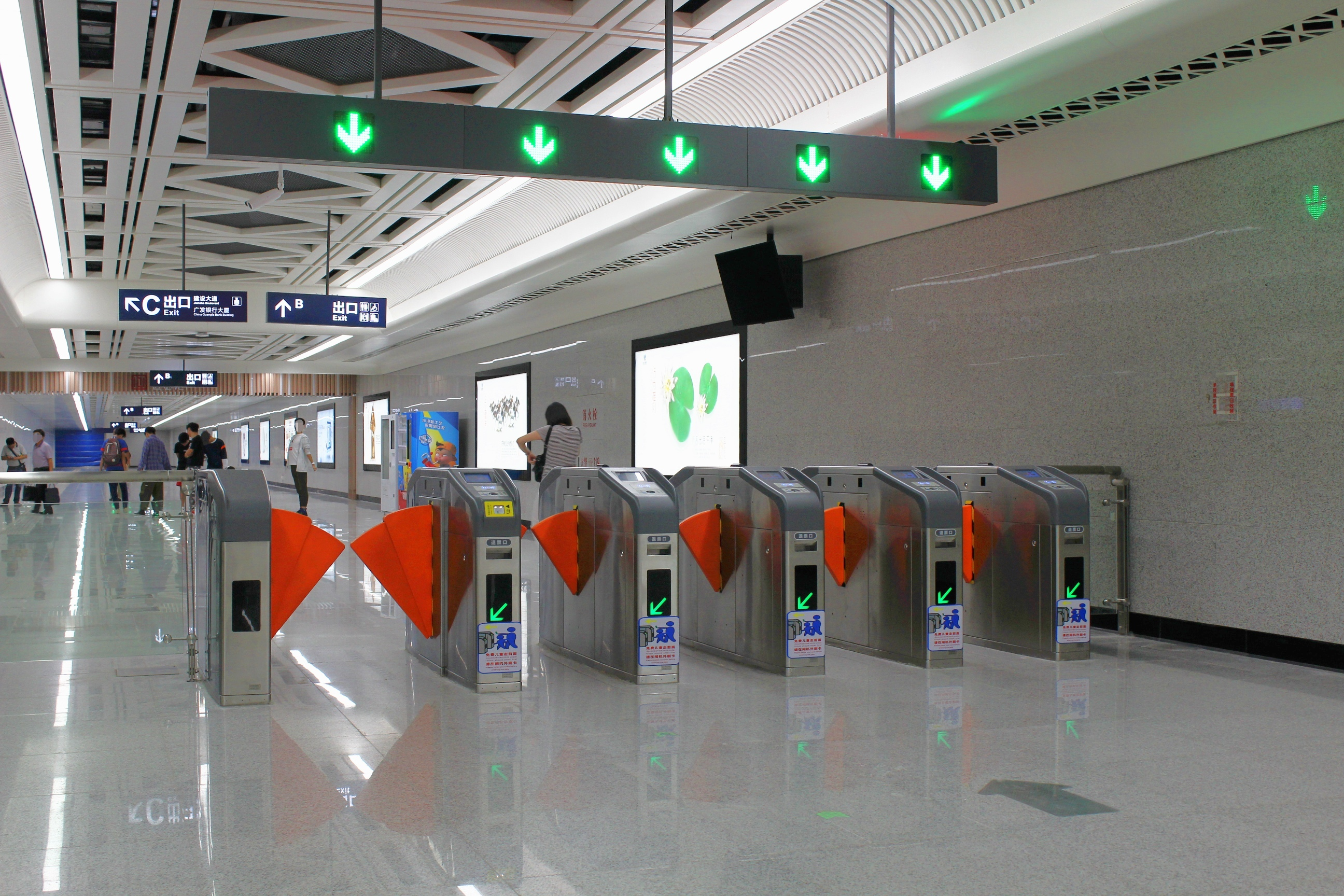
Concourse
