= Wangjiadun East station =

Wuhan Metro station

Wangjiadun East 王家墩东 metro
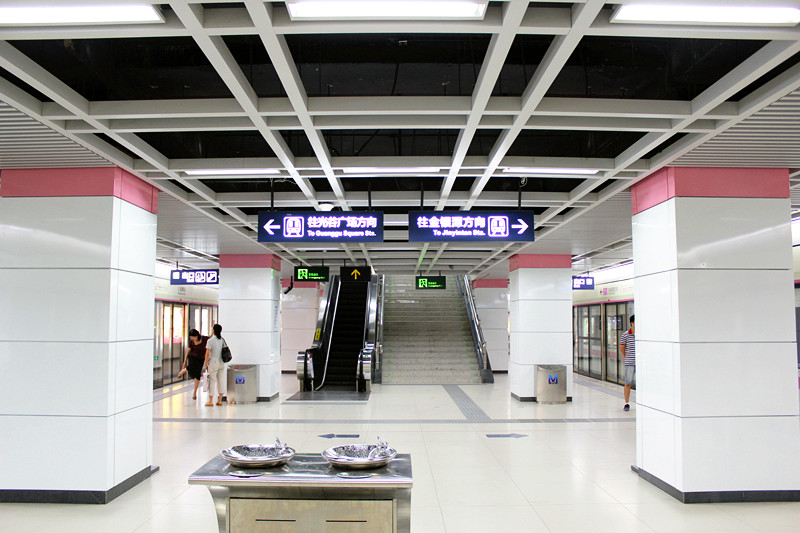
- Line 2 platform

General information
- Location: Jianghan District, Wuhan, Hubei; China
- Coordinates: 30°35′48″N 114°15′26″E
- Operator: Wuhan Metro Co., Ltd
- Lines: Line 2; Line 7
- Platforms: 4 (2 island platforms)

Construction
- Structure type: Underground

History
- Opened: December 28, 2012 (Line 2); October 1, 2018 (Line 7)

Services
Preceding station	Wuhan Metro	Following station
Fanhu towards Tianhe International Airport	Line 2	Qingnian Road towards Fozuling
Wuhan Business District towards Huangpi Square	Line 7	Qushuilou towards Qinglongshan Ditiexiaozhen
Location

Wangjiadun East Station (Chinese: 王家墩东站) is an interchange station of Line 2 and Line 7 of Wuhan Metro. It entered revenue service on December 28, 2012. It is located in Jianghan District.

== Station layout ==
G	Entrances and Exits	Exits A-G
B1	Concourse	Faregates, Station Agent
B2	Northbound	← Line 2 towards Tianhe International Airport (Fanhu)
B2	Island platform, doors will open on the left
B2	Southbound	Line 2 towards Fozuling (Qingnian Road) →
B3	Northbound	← Line 7 towards Huangpi Square (Wuhan Business District)
B3	Island platform, doors will open on the left
B3	Southbound	Line 7 towards Qinglongshan Ditiexiaozhen (Qushuilou) →

== Gallery ==
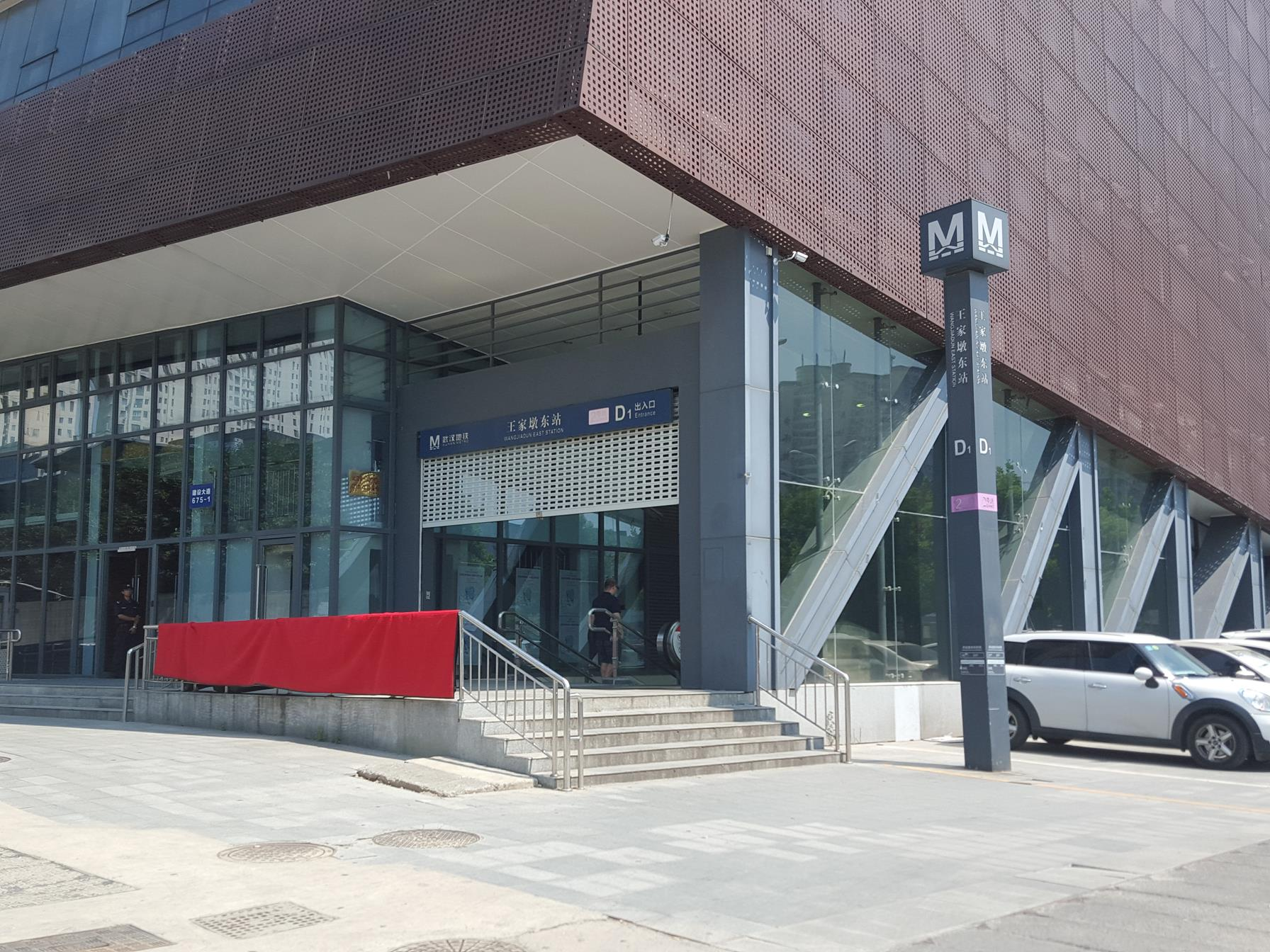
Entrance D1

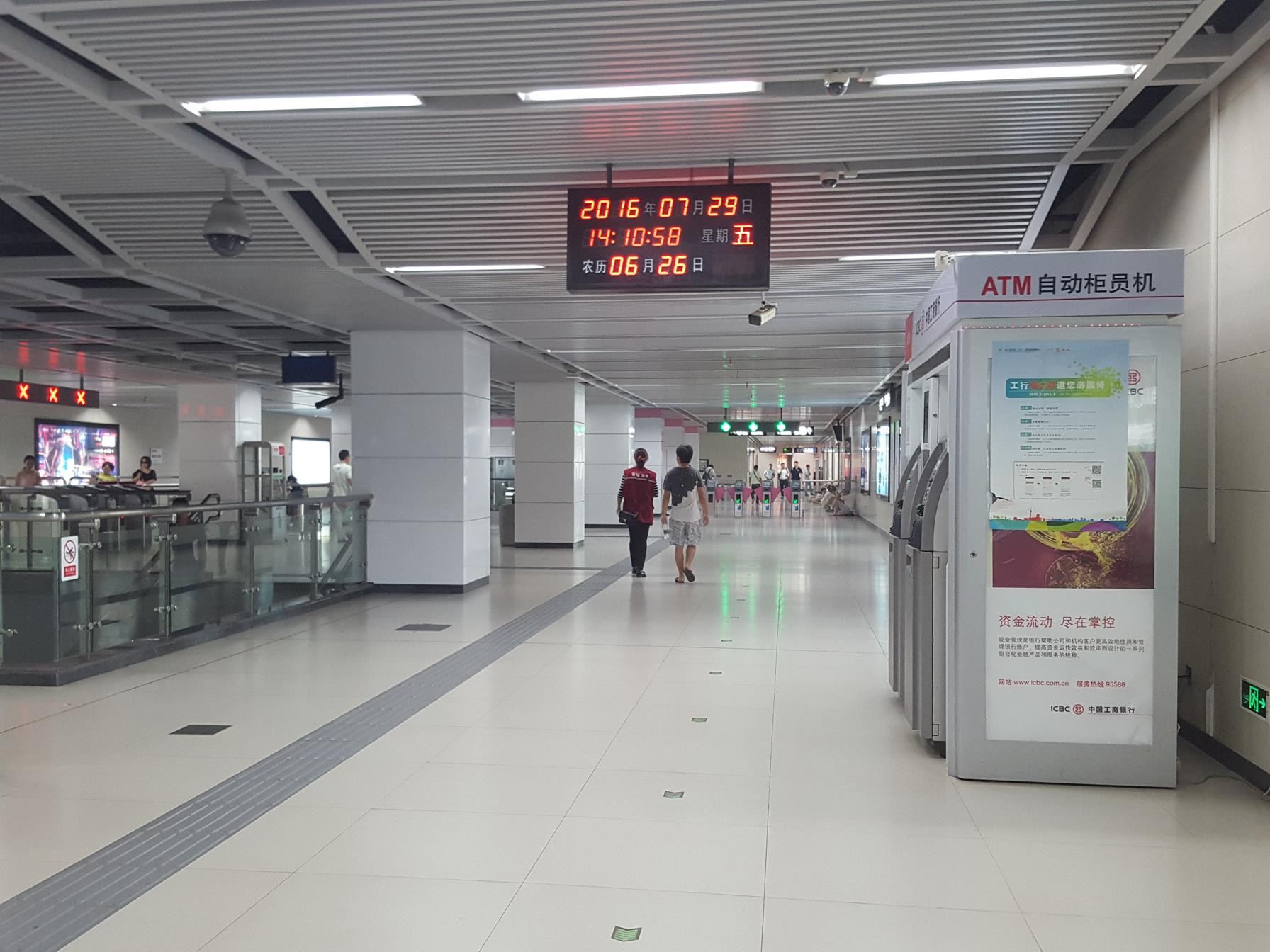
Concourse

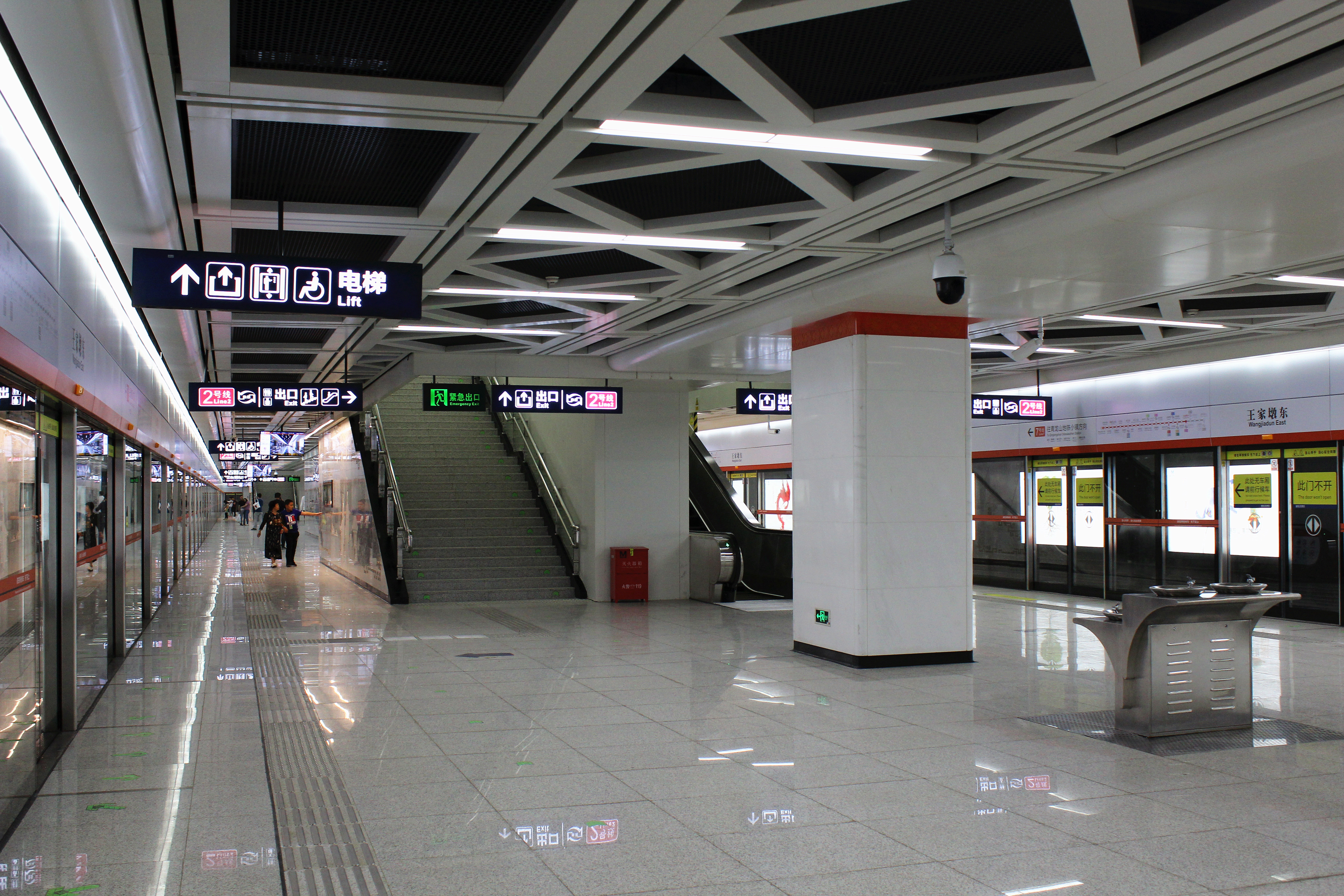
Line 7 platform
