= Dazhi Road station =

Wuhan Metro station

Dazhi Road 大智路 metro
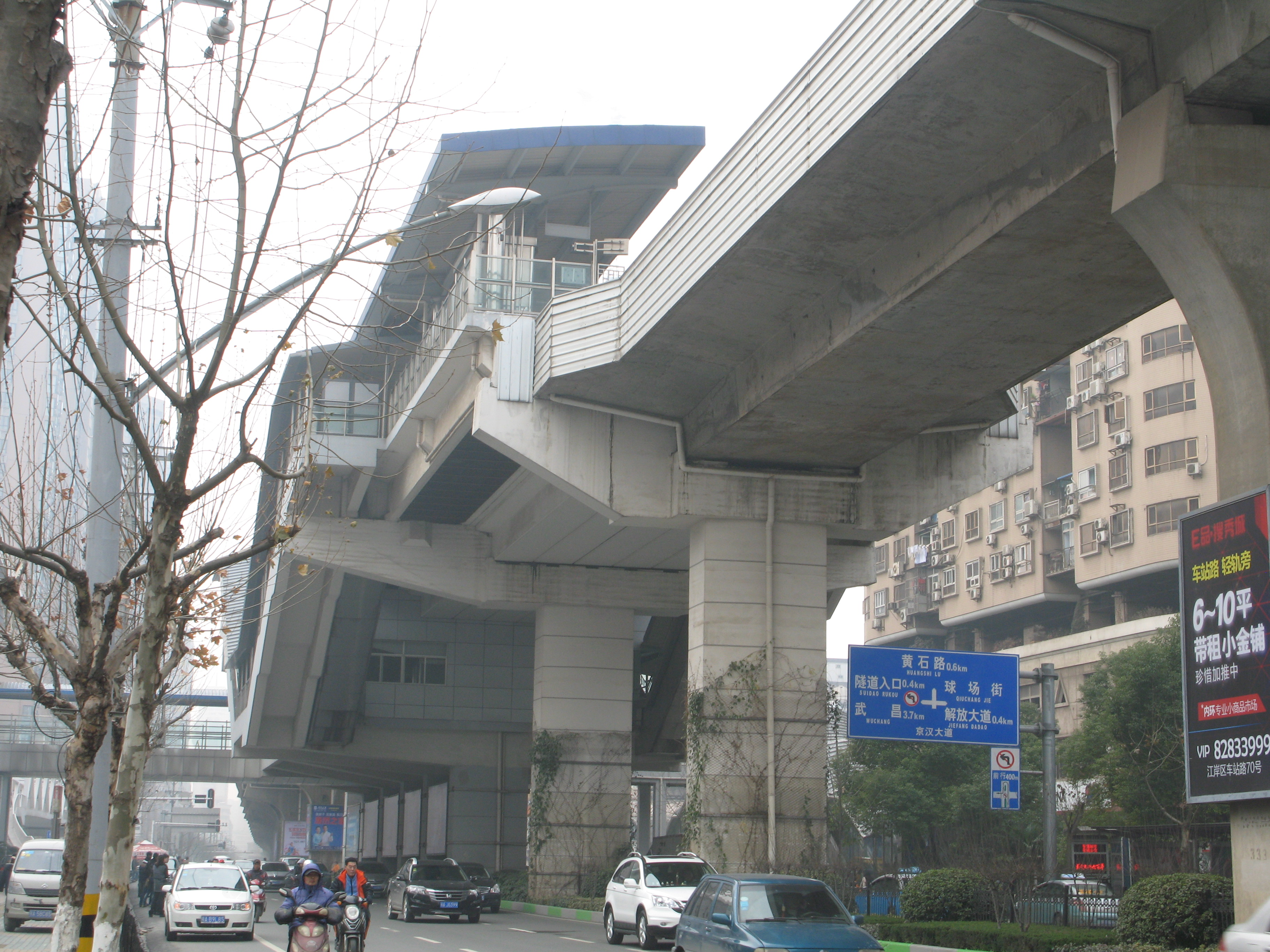
- Dazhi Road Station viewed from Jinghan Avenue.

General information
- Location: Jiang'an District, Wuhan, Hubei; China
- Coordinates: 30°35′32″N 114°17′43″E
- Operated by: Wuhan Metro Co., Ltd
- Lines: Line 1; Line 6
- Platforms: 4 (1 island platform, 2 side platforms)

History
- Opened: July 28, 2004; 21 years ago

Services
Preceding station	Wuhan Metro	Following station
Xunlimen towards Jinghe	Line 1	Sanyang Road towards Hankou North
Miaoli Road towards Xincheng 11th Road	Line 6	Jianghan Road towards Dongfeng Motor Corporation
Location

Dazhi Road Station (Chinese: 大智路; pinyin: Dàzhì Lù) serves as an interchange station of Line 1 and Line 6 of Wuhan Metro. It entered revenue service along with the completion of Line 1, Phase 1 on July 28, 2004. The station situates at the intersection of Jinghan Avenue and Dazhi Road, immediately above the historic site of the Dazhimen railway station of the depleted Jinghan Railway (simplified Chinese: 京汉铁路; traditional Chinese: 京漢鐵路; pinyin: Jīnghàn Tiělù), which exited revenue service in 1991. The station is also adjacent to Wuhan Yangtze River Tunnel connecting Dazhi Road in Hankou to Youyi Avenue and Shahu Bridge in Wuchang.

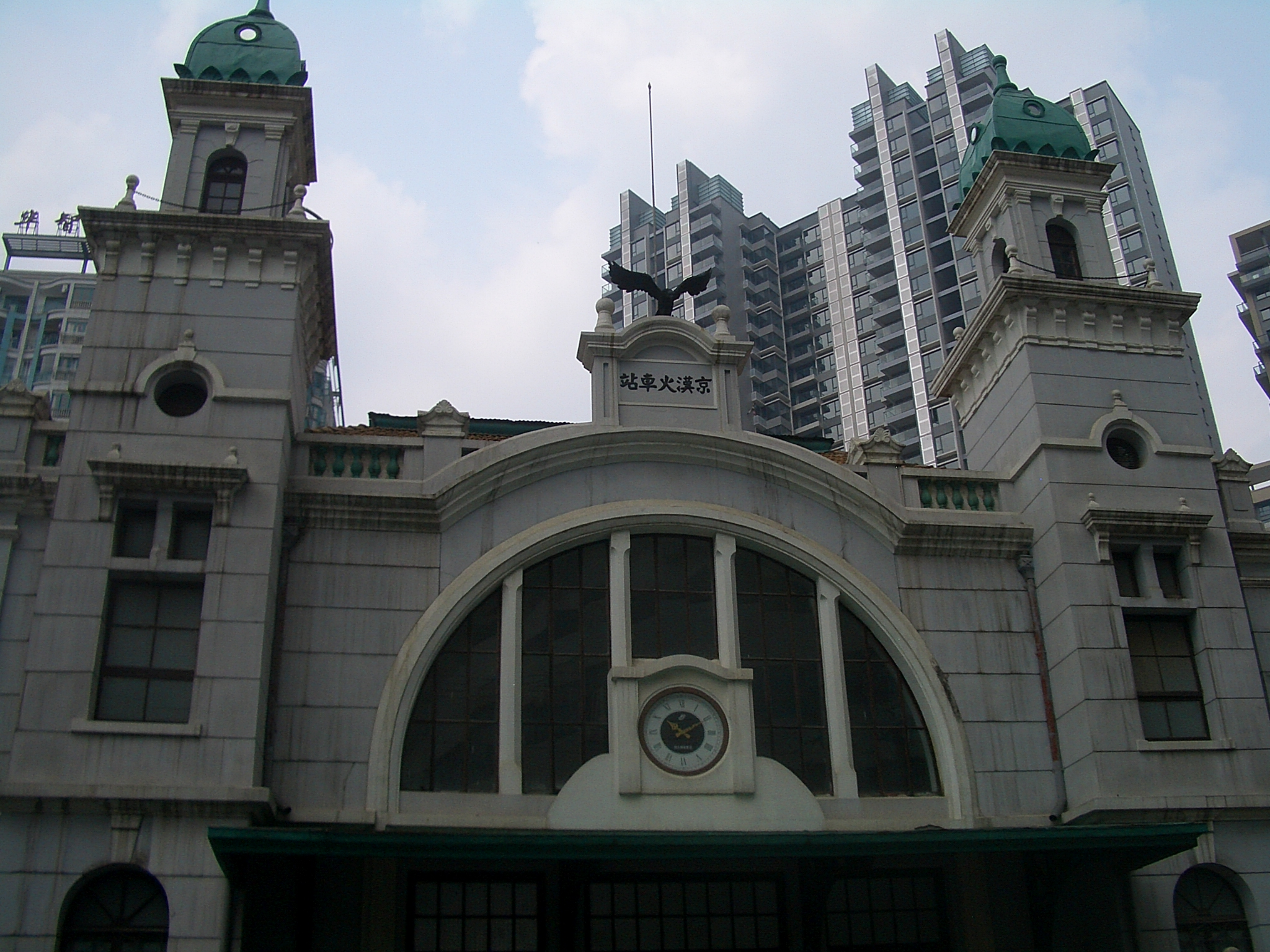
The historic Dazhimen railway station on the demolished Beijing-Hankou Railway beneath the Dazhi Road Station of Line 1.

== Station layout ==
3F	Side platform, doors open on the right
3F	Westbound	← Line 1 towards Jinghe (Xunlimen)
3F	Eastbound	Line 1 towards Hankou North (Sanyang Road) →
3F	Side platform, doors open on the right
2F	Concourse	Faregates, Station Agent
G	Entrances and Exits	Exits A-G
B1	Concourse	Faregates, Station Agent
B2	Northbound	← Line 6 towards Xincheng 11th Road (Miaoli Road)
B2	Island platform, doors open on the left
B2	Southbound	Line 6 towards Dongfeng Motor Corporation (Jianghan Road) →

== Facilities ==
Dazhi Road Station for Line 1 is a three-story elevated station placed along Jinghan Avenue. The station has two side platforms accommodating a pair of tracks, and is equipped with attended customer service concierges, automatic ticket vending machines, and accessible ramps. A single refuge siding is constructed just south of the station for trains to enter and exit service during peak/off-peak hours.

The station for Line 6 is underground, with an island platform aligned with Dazhi Road.

== Exits ==
There are currently seven exits in service:

- Exit A: Southeastern side of Jinghan Avenue. Accessible to Jiqing Street, Wufangzhai Restaurant.
- Exit B: Northeastern side of Jinghan Avenue. Accessible to the historic site of Dazhimen Station.
- Exit C: Northwestern side of Jinghan Avenue. Accessible to Raycom Skyline.
- Exit D: Southwestern side of Jinghan Avenue.
- Exit E: Northeastern side of Dazhi Road. This exit has two branch exits, E_{1} and E_{2}, which are in two different directions.
- Exit F: Northwestern side of Dazhi Road.
- Exit G: Southwestern side of Dazhi Road.

== Transfers ==
Bus transfers to Route 622, 711 and 801 are available at Dazhi Road Station.
