= Wuhan Union Hospital =

Hospital in Wuhan, Hubei, China

- National Health Commission

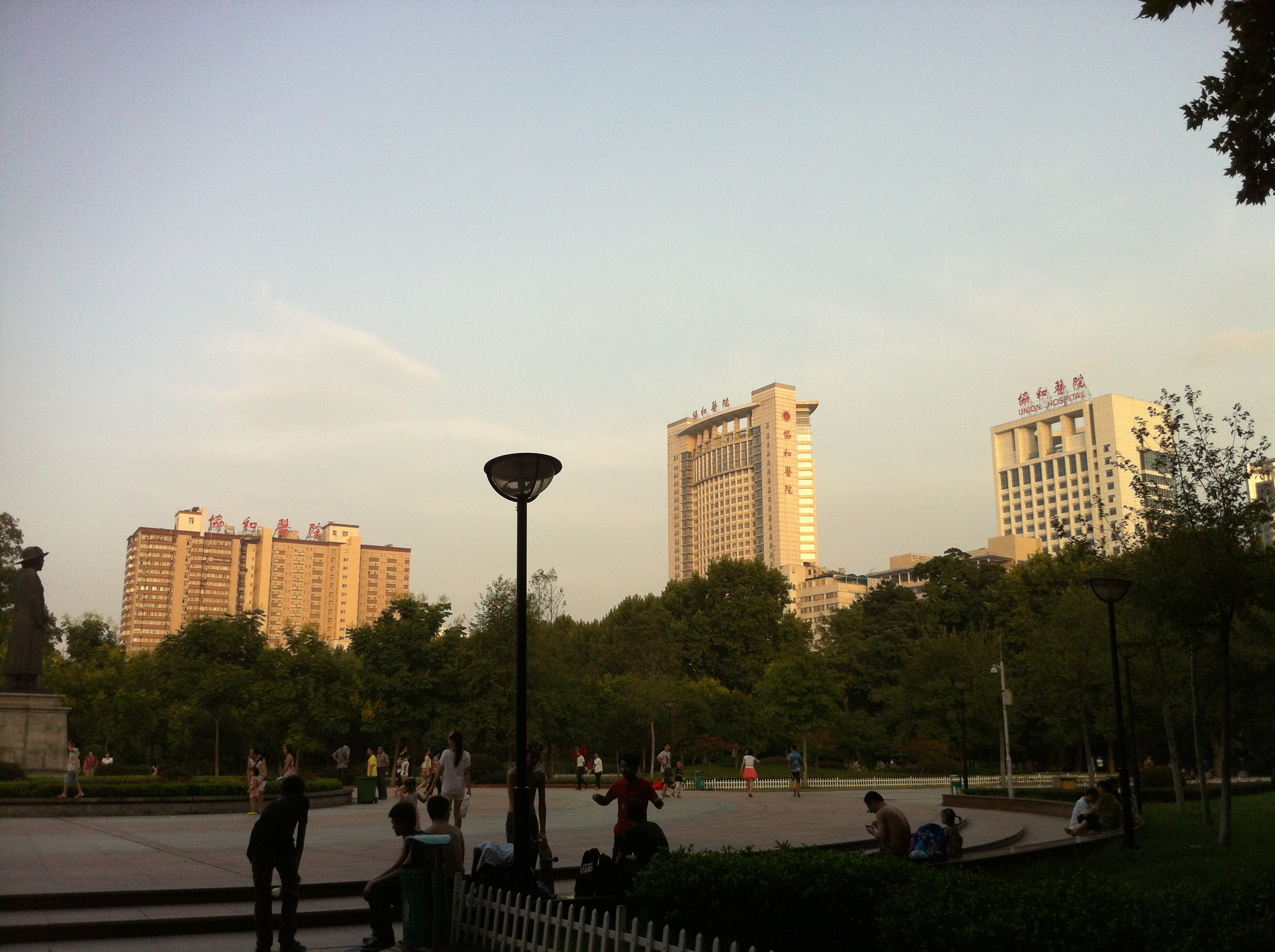

Geography
- Location: Jianghan, Wuhan, Hubei, China
- Coordinates: 30°35′0.5″N 114°16′32.1″E

Organisation
- Type: Teaching
- Affiliated university: Huazhong University of Science and Technology

Services
- Beds: 5,000

History
- Founded: September 8, 1866; 159 years ago

Links
- Website: Official website

The Wuhan Union Hospital (simplified Chinese: 武汉协和医院; traditional Chinese: 武漢協和醫院; pinyin: Wǔhàn Xiéhé Yīyuàn) is a largest teaching hospital and oldest historical hospital was since 1866 in Jianghan District, Wuhan, Hubei, China.

== History ==
The hospital was founded by Griffith John on September 8, 1866, as Hankow Renji Hospital. In 1928, it was renamed as Hankow Union Hospital. In 1950, it was placed under the jurisdiction of the Medical College of Wuhan University. In 1953, it became the First Affiliated Hospital of Wuhan Medical College. In 1985, it became the Union Hospital of Tongji Medical University. In 2000, it became the Union Hospital of Tongji Medical College of Huazhong University of Science and Technology.

In 2020, the hospital became one of the designated hospitals to treat patients with COVID-19 during the COVID-19 pandemic.

== Architecture ==
The hospital consists of the Main Campus, West Campus, Tumor Center and Jinyinhu Hospital. It can accommodate a total of 5,000 beds.

== Transportation ==
The hospital is accessible within walking distance east of Zhongshan Park Station of Wuhan Metro.
