= Xiaodongmen station =

Metro station in Wuhan, China

Xiaodongmen 小东门 metro

General information
- Location: Wuchang District, Wuhan, Hubei; China
- Coordinates: 30.54733°N 114.31315°E
- Operated by: Wuhan Metro Co., Ltd
- Line: Line 7
- Platforms: 2 (1 island platform)

Construction
- Structure type: Underground

History
- Opened: October 1, 2018 (Line 7)

Services
Preceding station	Wuhan Metro	Following station
Pangxiejia towards Huangpi Square	Line 7	Wuchang Railway Station towards Qinglongshan Ditiexiaozhen
Location

Xiaodongmen Station (Chinese: 小东门站) is a station on Line 7 of the Wuhan Metro. It entered revenue service on October 1, 2018. It is located in Wuchang District.

== Station layout ==
G	Entrances and Exits
B1	Concourse	Faregates, Station Agent
B2	Northbound	← Line 7 towards Huangpi Square (Pangxiejia)
B2	Island platform, doors will open on the left
B2	Southbound	Line 7 towards Qinglongshan Ditiexiaozhen (Wuchang Railway Station) →
