= Xinhe Street station =

Metro station in Wuhan, China

Xinhe Street 新河街 metro

General information
- Location: Wuchang District, Wuhan, Hubei; China
- Coordinates: 30.56607°N 114.31174°E
- Operated by: Wuhan Metro Co., Ltd
- Line: Line 7
- Platforms: 2 (1 island platform)

Construction
- Structure type: Underground

History
- Opened: October 1, 2018 (Line 7)

Services
Preceding station	Wuhan Metro	Following station
Hubei University towards Huangpi Square	Line 7	Pangxiejia towards Qinglongshan Ditiexiaozhen
Location

Xinhe Street Station (Chinese: 新河街站) is a station on Line 7 of the Wuhan Metro. It entered revenue service on October 1, 2018. It is located in Wuchang District.

== Station layout ==
G	Entrances and Exits
B1	Concourse	Faregates, Station Agent
B2	Northbound	← Line 7 towards Huangpi Square (Hubei University)
B2	Island platform, doors will open on the left
B2	Southbound	Line 7 towards Qinglongshan Ditiexiaozhen (Pangxiejia) →
