= Jiyuqiao station =

Wuhan Metro station

Jiyuqiao 积玉桥 metro
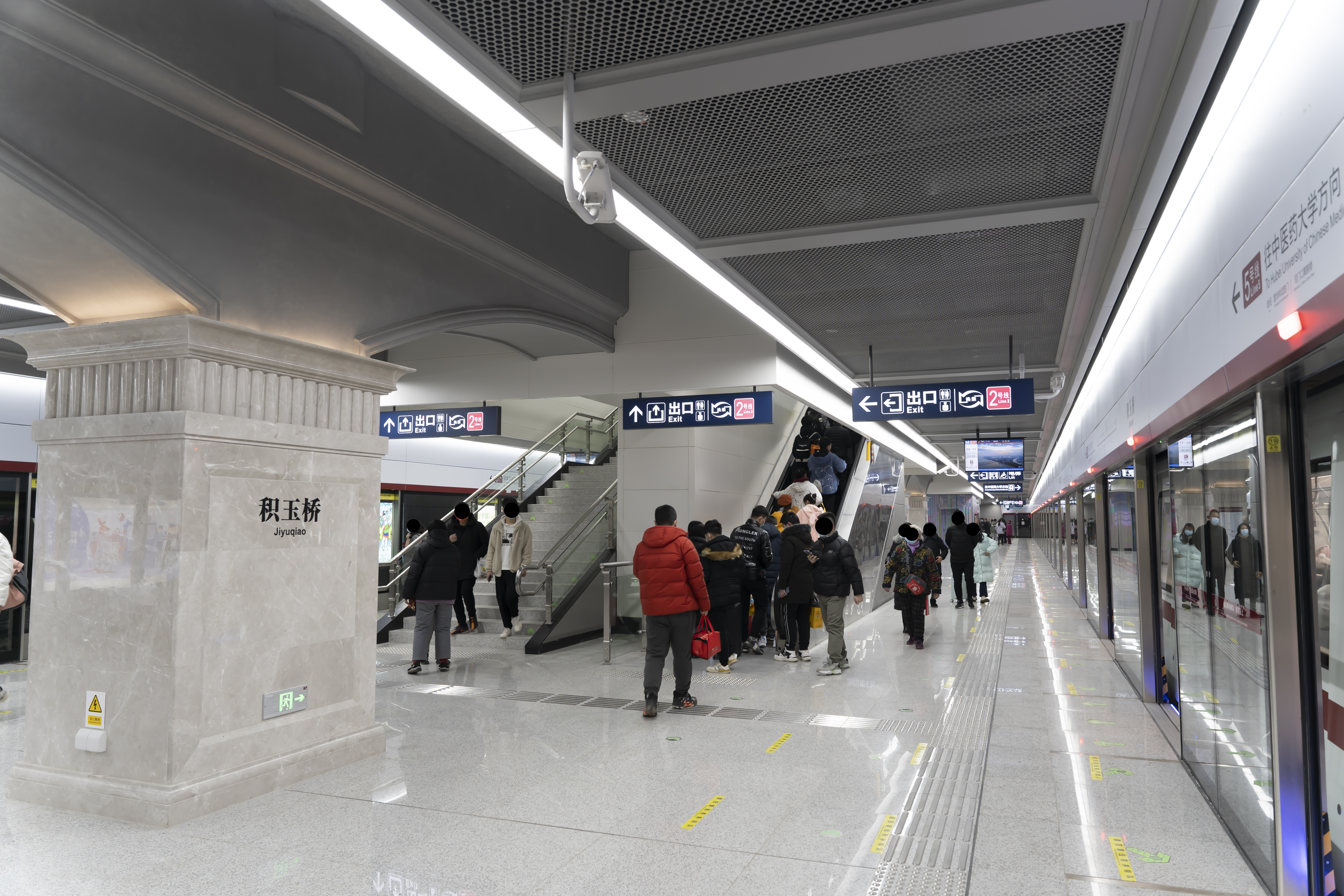
- Line 5 platform

General information
- Location: Wuchang District, Wuhan, Hubei; China
- Coordinates: 30°33′48″N 114°18′12″E
- Operated by: Wuhan Metro Co., Ltd
- Lines: Line 2; Line 5
- Platforms: 4 (2 island platforms)

Construction
- Structure type: Underground

History
- Opened: December 28, 2012 (Line 2); December 26, 2021 (Line 5)

Services
Preceding station	Wuhan Metro	Following station
Jianghan Road towards Tianhe International Airport	Line 2	Pangxiejia towards Fozuling
Sancenglou towards East Square of Wuhan Railway Station	Line 5	Tanhualin & Wushengmen towards Hongxia
Location

Jiyuqiao Station (Chinese: 积玉桥站) is a station on Line 2 and Line 5 of the Wuhan Metro. It entered revenue service on December 28, 2012. It is located in Wuchang District.

== Station layout ==
G	Entrances and Exits	Exits A-D
B1	Concourse	Faregates, Station Agent
B2	Northbound	← Line 2 towards Tianhe International Airport (Jianghan Road)
B2	Island platform, doors will open on the left
B2	Southbound	Line 2 towards Fozuling (Pangxiejia) →
B2	Northbound	← Line 5 towards East Square of Wuhan Railway Station (Sancenglou)
B2	Island platform, doors will open on the left
B2	Southbound	Line 5 towards Hubei University of Chinese Medicine (Tanhualin & Wushengmen) →

== Gallery ==
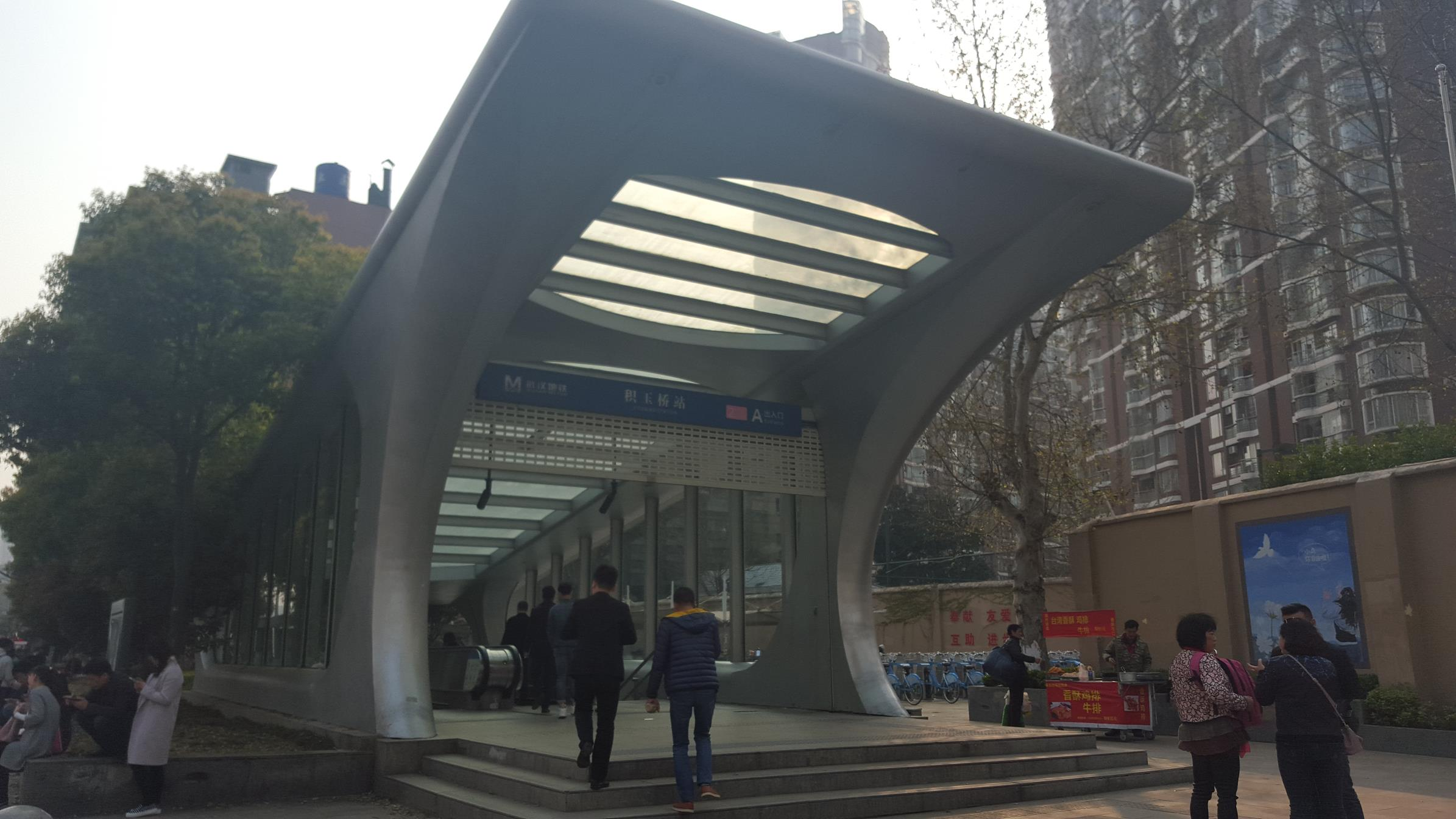
Entrance A

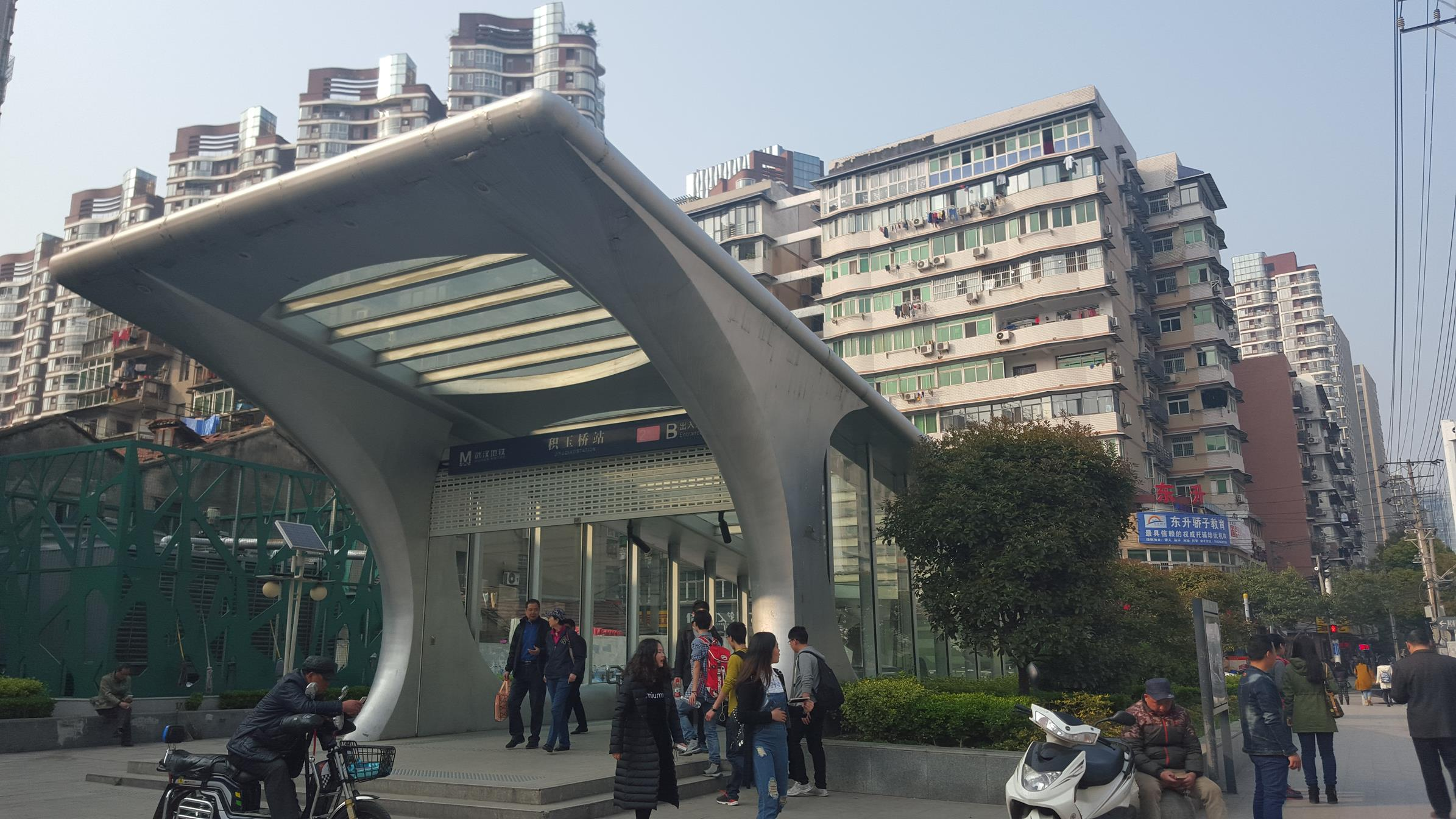
Entrance B

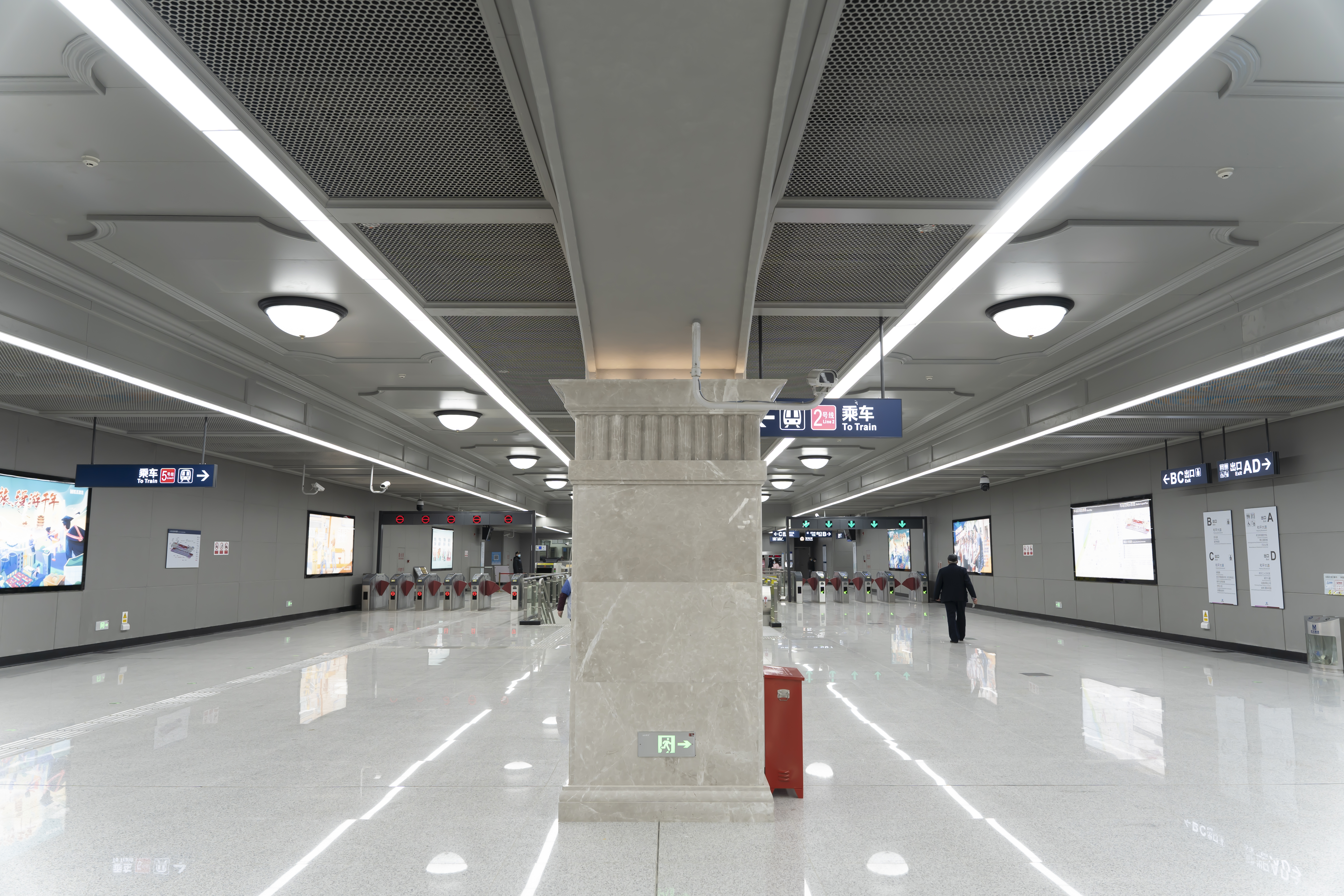
Concourse

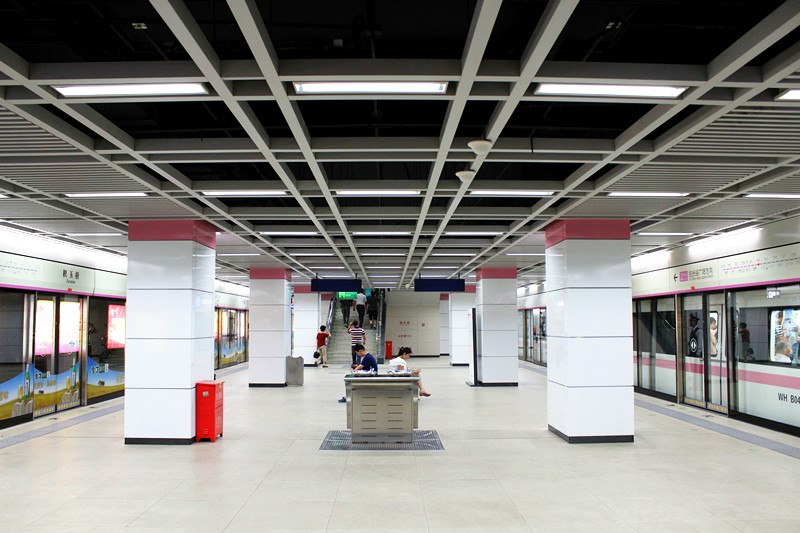
Line 2 platform

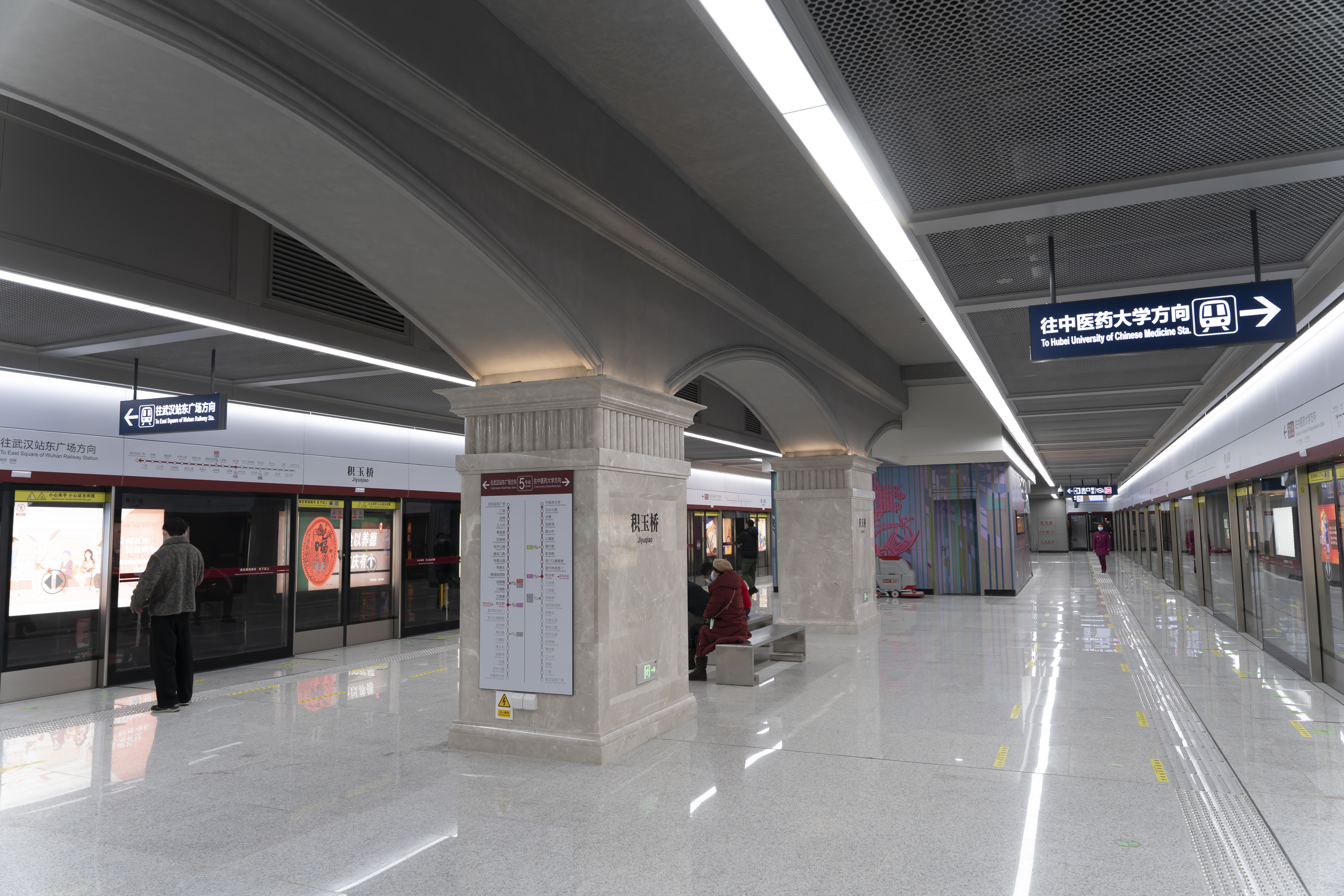
Line 5 platform
