= Yangyuan & Tiesiyuan station =

Metro station in Wuhan, China

Yangyuan & Tiesiyuan 杨园铁四院 metro
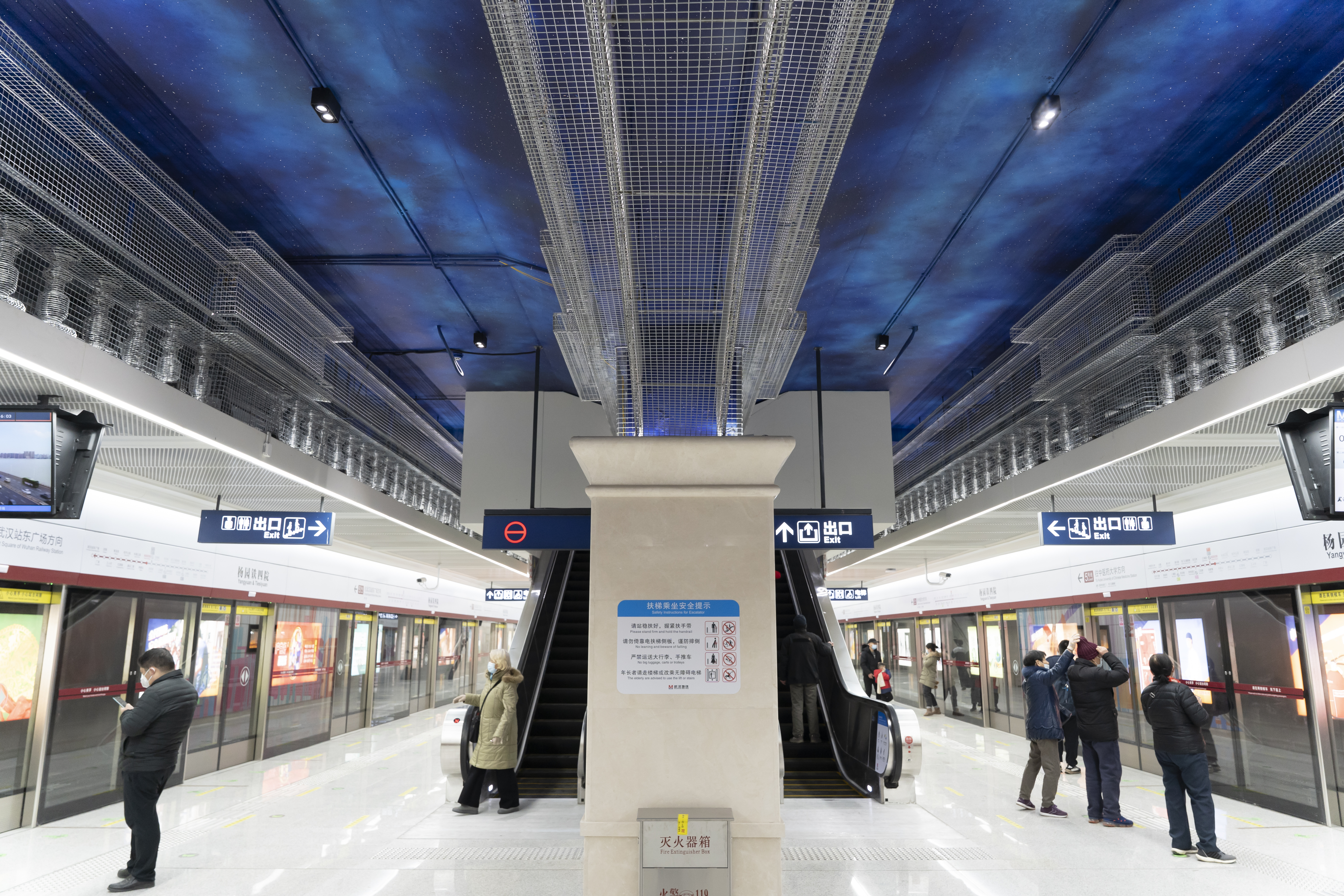

General information
- Location: Wuchang District, Wuhan, Hubei; China
- Coordinates: 30.6021°N 114.3376°E
- Operated by: Wuhan Metro Co., Ltd
- Line: Line 5

Construction
- Structure type: Underground

History
- Opened: December 26, 2021

Services
Preceding station	Wuhan Metro	Following station
Yujiatou towards East Square of Wuhan Railway Station	Line 5	Xujiapeng towards Hongxia
Location

Yangyuan & Tiesiyuan station (Chinese: 杨园铁四院站) is a station on Line 5 of the Wuhan Metro in Wuhan, China.

In 2020, before it opened, the station was the location of a building information modeling (BIM) competition between multiple firms, hosted by Wuhan Metro Group. Each participating company used the station as a testing ground for BIM technology.

The station officially opened on 26 December 2021.

== Art and architecture ==
The station's design theme is "impressions of the new city" (新城印记), and its art wall is based on the theme of "the era of surging forward" (奔腾时代). The station's appearance is inspired by historical railway engineering.

The interior design includes European-inspired elements, with marble walls and pillars.

The station has four exits.
