= Line 5 (Wuhan Metro) =

Line of Wuhan Metro

- 5
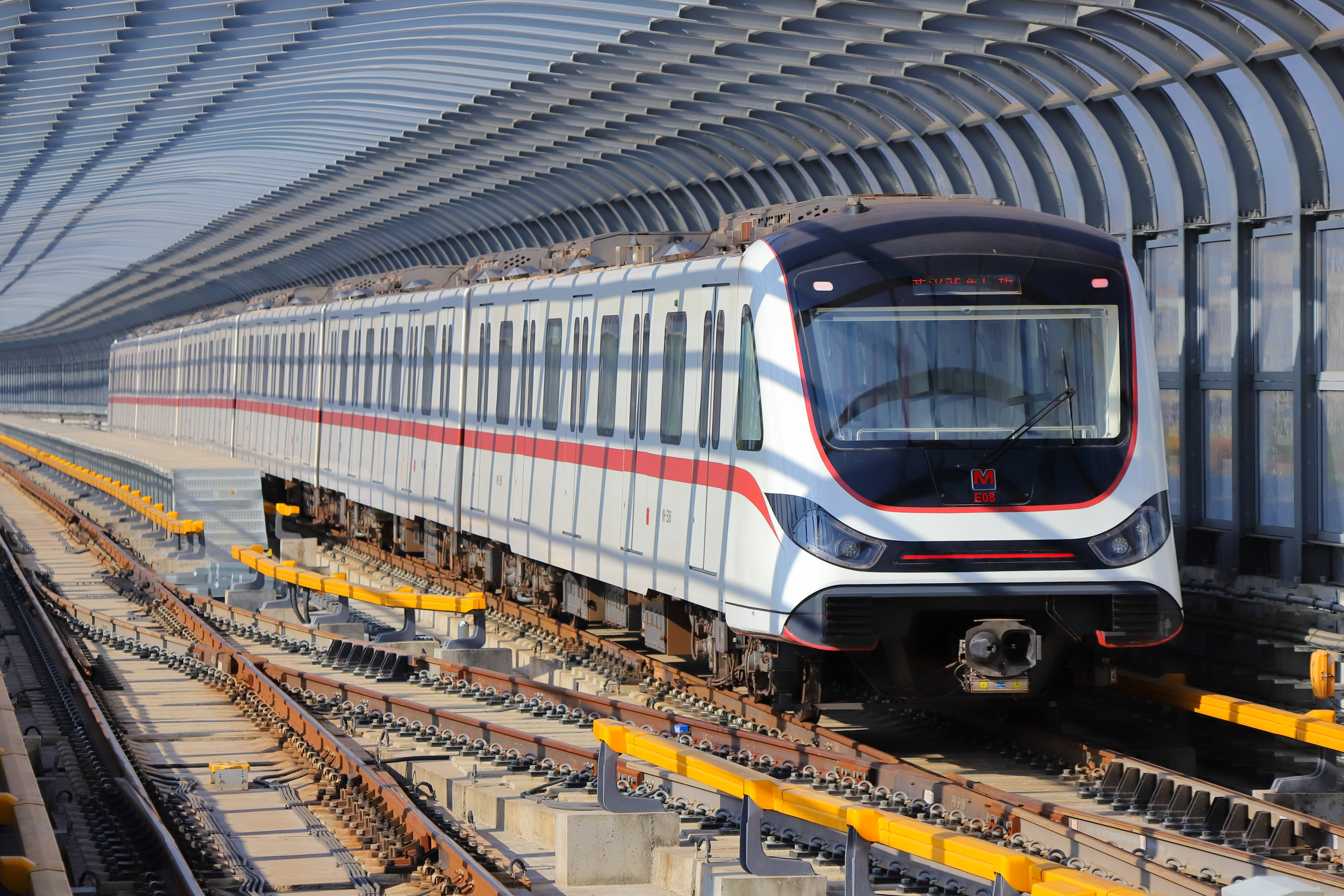

Overview
- Status: Operational
- Owner: Wuhan
- Locale: Wuhan, Hubei, China
- Termini: East Square of Wuhan Railway Station; Hongxia
- Stations: 25

Service
- Type: Rapid transit
- System: Wuhan Metro
- Services: 1
- Operator: Wuhan Metro Group Co., Ltd.

History
- Opened: 26 December 2021; 4 years ago

Technical
- Line length: 34.6 km (21.5 mi)
- Num of tracks: 2
- Character: Underground and elevated
- Track gauge: 1,435 mm (4 ft 8 1/2 in)
- Operating speed: 80 km/h (50 mph)

Line 5 of the Wuhan Metro (Chinese: 武汉轨道交通5号线) is a metro line in the city of Wuhan, Hubei.

It has a maximum speed of 80 kilometres per hour (50 mph) and has driverless trains operating on the line. The line started operation on 26 December 2021.

== History ==
Segment	Commencement	Length	Station(s)	Name
East Square of Wuhan Railway Station — Hubei University of Chinese Medicine	26 December 2021	34.6 km (21.5 mi)	25	Phase 1
Hubei University of Chinese Medicine — Hongxia	1 December 2023	2.63 km (1.63 mi)	2	Phase 2

== Stations ==
Station name		Connections	Distance km		Location
English	Chinese	Connections	Distance km		Location
East Square of Wuhan Railway Station	武汉站东广场	4 (Note: Out of system transfer at Wuhan Railway Station) 19 (Note: Out of system transfer at West Square of Wuhan Railway Station) WS WG WHN	0	0	Hongshan
Changqian	厂前				Hongshan
Wugang	武钢				Qingshan
Gongrencun	工人村				Qingshan
Qingyiju	青宜居				Qingshan
Honggangcheng	红钢城				Qingshan
Heping Park	和平公园				Qingshan
Jianshe 2nd Road	建设二路				Qingshan
Science Park	科普公园	12			Qingshan
Yujiatou	余家头	10			Wuchang
Yangyuan & Tiesiyuan	杨园铁四院				Wuchang
Xujiapeng	徐家棚	7 8			Wuchang
Sanjiao Road	三角路				Wuchang
Sancenglou	三层楼				Wuchang
Jiyuqiao	积玉桥	2			Wuchang
Tanhualin & Wushengmen	昙华林武胜门				Wuchang
Simenkou & Yellow Crane Tower	司门口黄鹤楼				Wuchang
Pengliuyang	彭刘杨				Wuchang
Fuxing Road	复兴路	4; 11 (Note: Out of system transfer at Ziyanghu)			Wuchang
Bapu Street	八铺街				Wuchang
Fenghuocun	烽火村				Wuchang
Zhangjiawan	张家湾				Hongshan
Guangxia	光霞	12			Hongshan
Baisha 6th Road	白沙六路				Hongshan
Hubei University of Chinese Medicine	中医药大学				Hongshan
Huangjiahu (Wuhan University of Science and Technology)	黄家湖（武科大）				Hongshan
Hongxia	红霞				Hongshan
