= Pangxiejia station =

Wuhan Metro station

Pangxiejia 螃蟹岬 metro
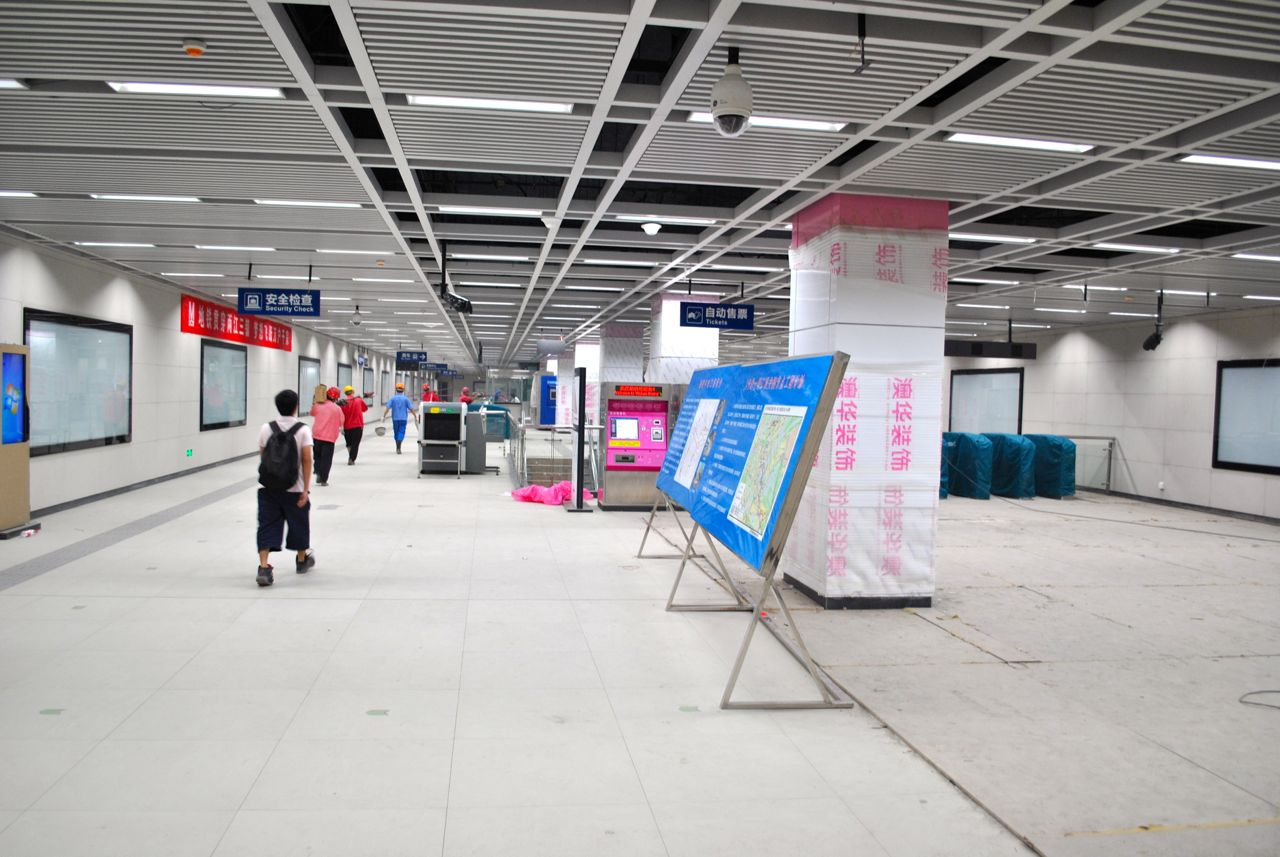

General information
- Location: Wuchang District, Wuhan, Hubei; China
- Coordinates: 30°33′22″N 114°18′41″E
- Operator: Wuhan Metro Co., Ltd
- Lines: Line 2; Line 7
- Platforms: 4 (2 island platforms)

Construction
- Structure type: Underground

History
- Opened: December 28, 2012 (Line 2); October 1, 2018 (Line 7)

Services
| Preceding station | Wuhan Metro | Following station |
|---|---|---|
| Jiyuqiao towards Tianhe International Airport | Line 2 | Xiaoguishan towards Fozuling |
| Xinhe Street towards Huangpi Square | Line 7 | Xiaodongmen towards Qinglongshan Ditiexiaozhen |
Location

Pangxiejia Station (Chinese: 螃蟹岬) is a station of Line 2 and Line 7 of Wuhan Metro. It entered revenue service on December 28, 2012. It is located in Wuchang District.

== Station layout ==
| G | Entrances and Exits | Exits A-F |
| B1 | Concourse | Faregates, Station Agent |
| B2 | Northbound | ← Line 2 towards Tianhe International Airport (Jiyuqiao) |
| B2 | Island platform, doors will open on the left |
| B2 | Southbound | Line 2 towards Fozuling (Xiaoguishan) → |
| B3 | Northbound | ← Line 7 towards Huangpi Square (Xinhe Street) |
| B3 | Island platform, doors will open on the left |
| B3 | Southbound | Line 7 towards Qinglongshan Ditiexiaozhen (Xiaodongmen) → |

== Gallery ==
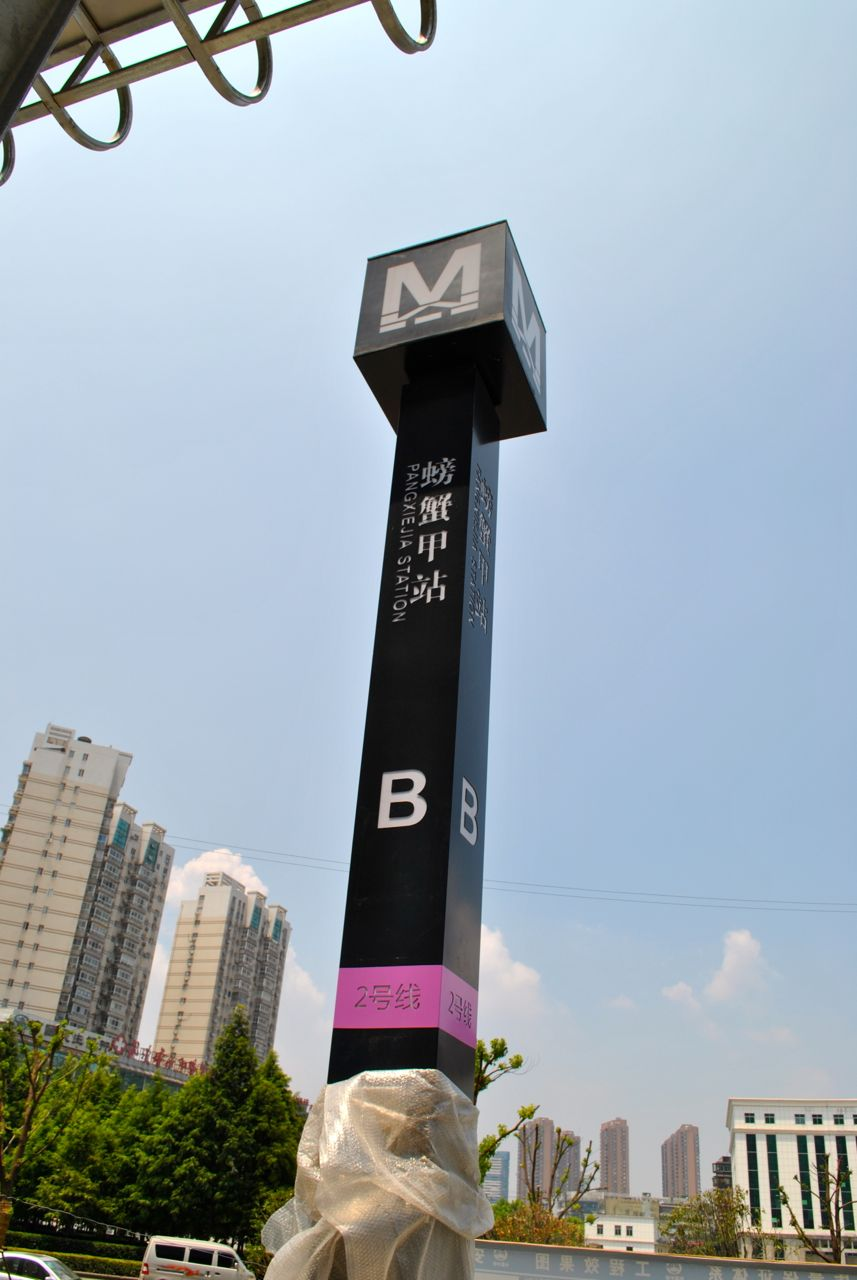
Pole

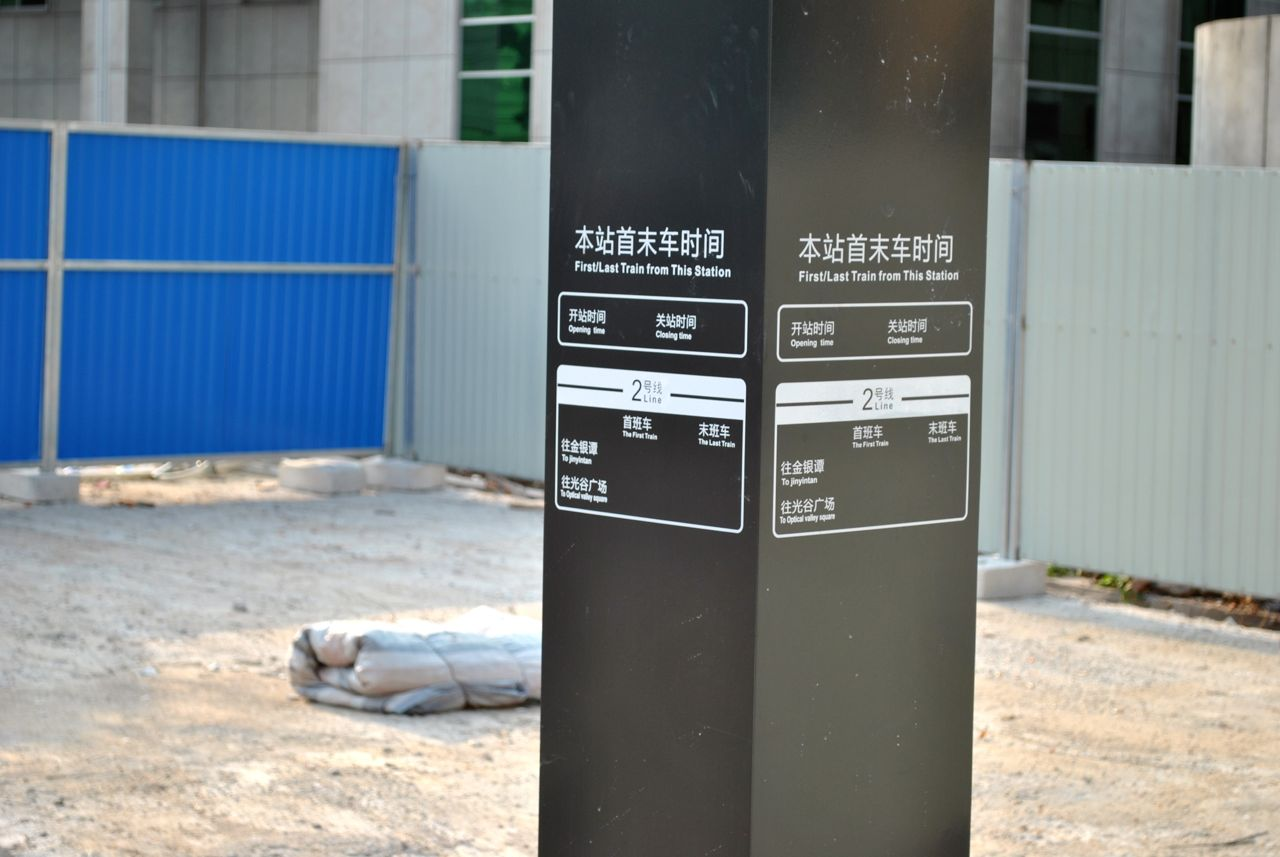
Timetable

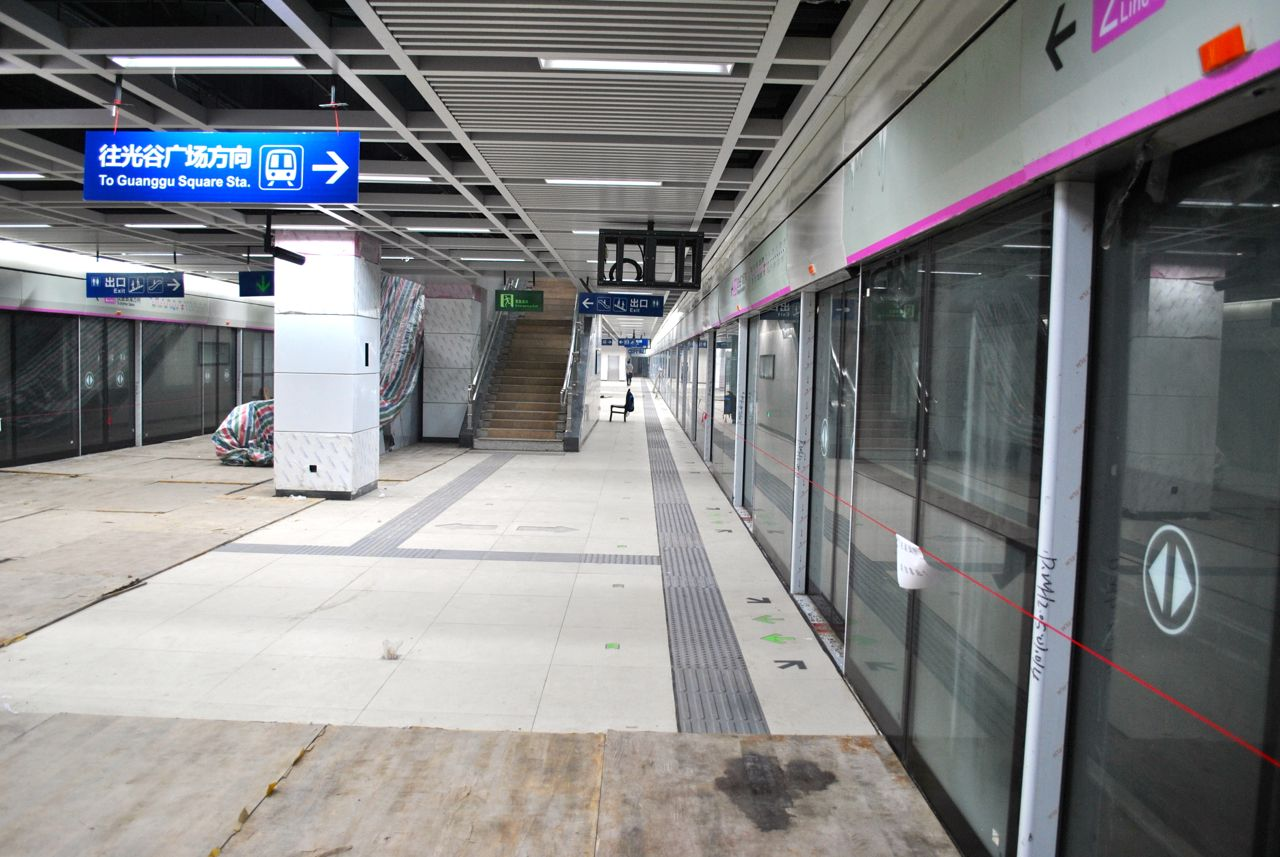
Line 2 Platform

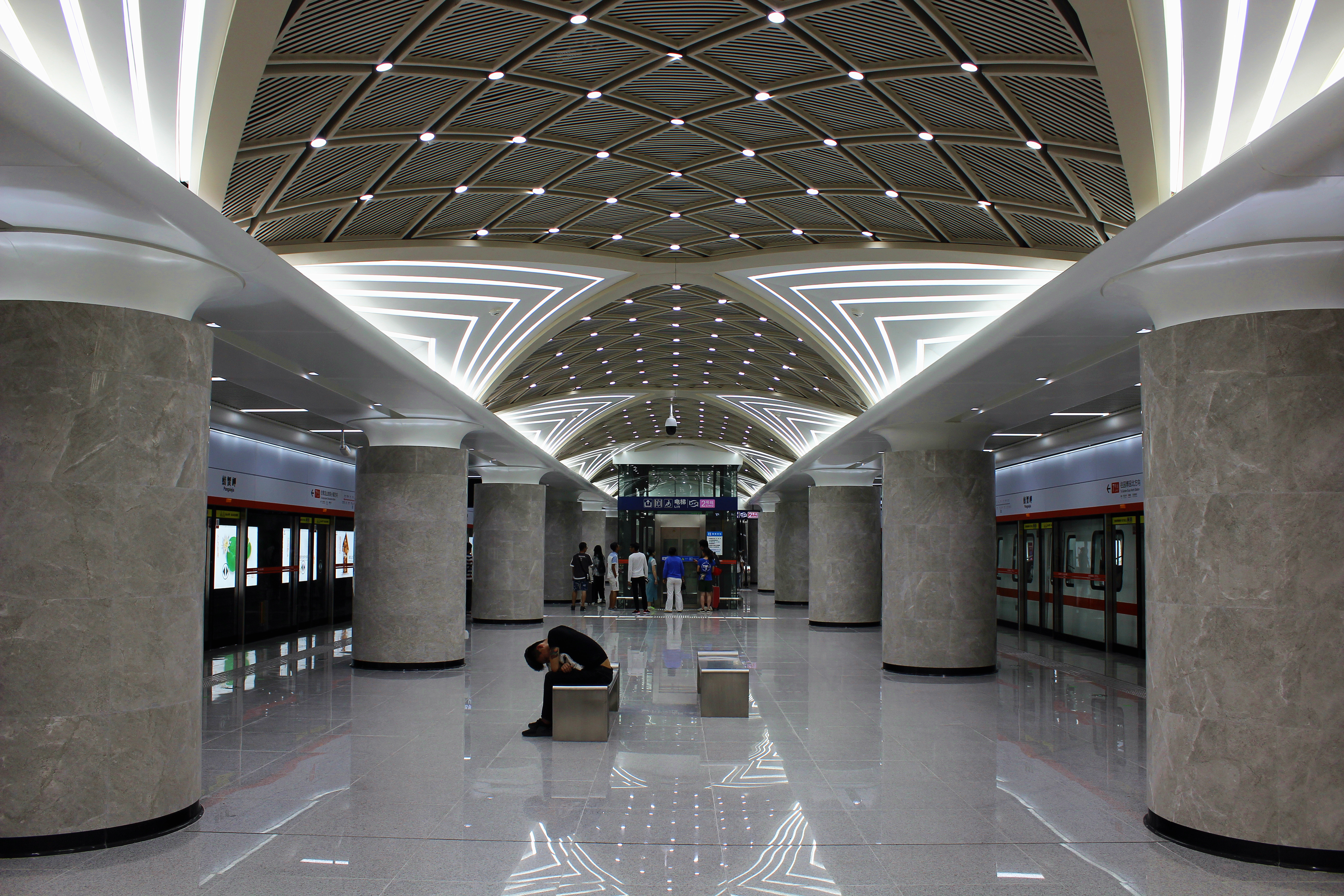
Line 7 Platform

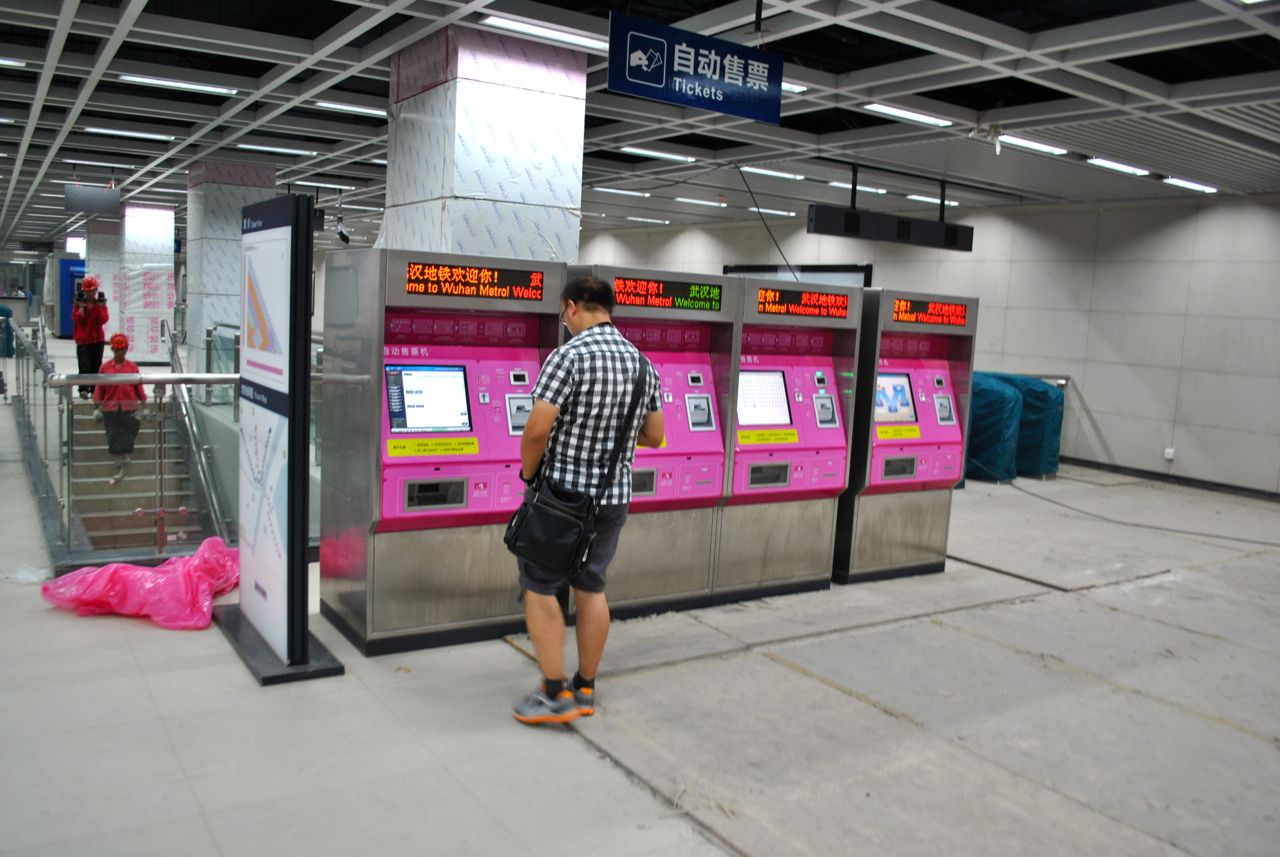
Ticket vending machine

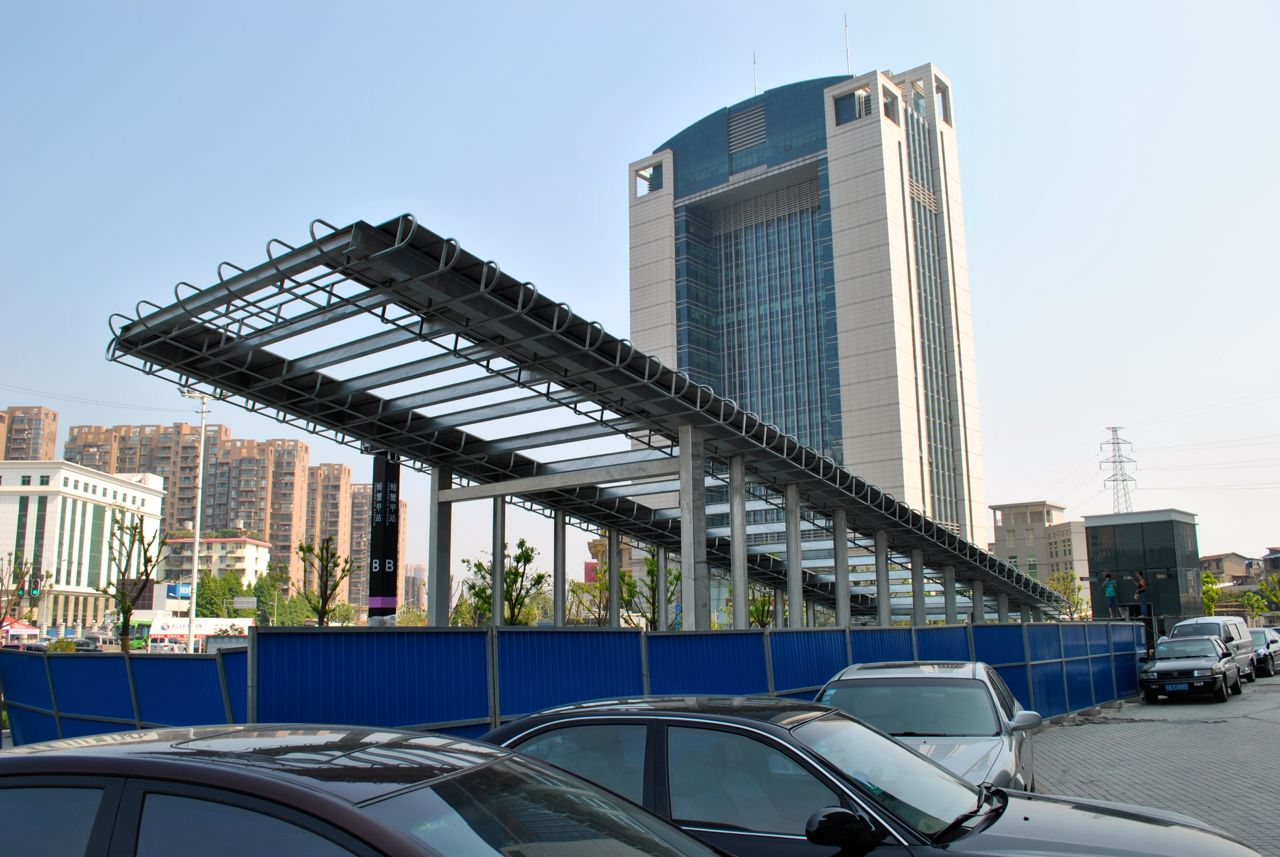
Exit

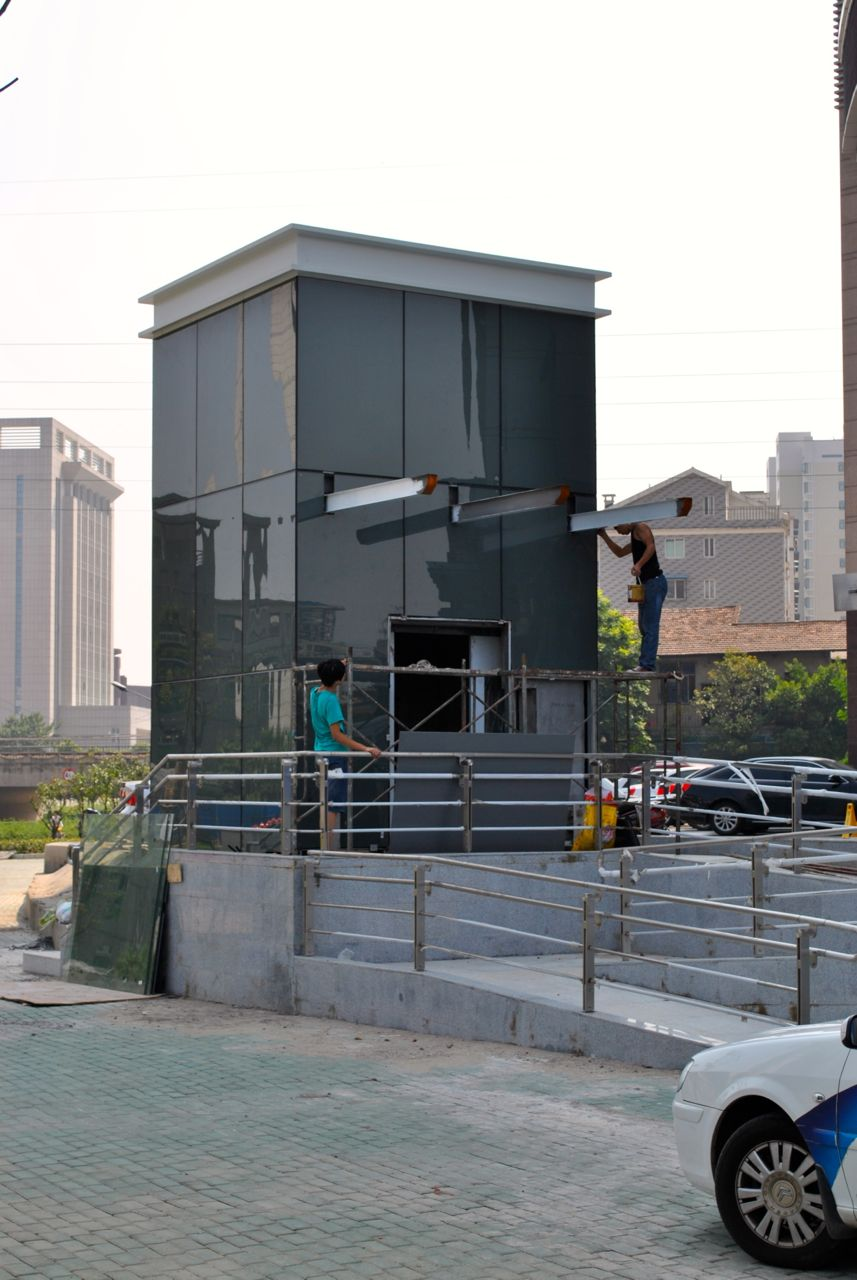
Lift

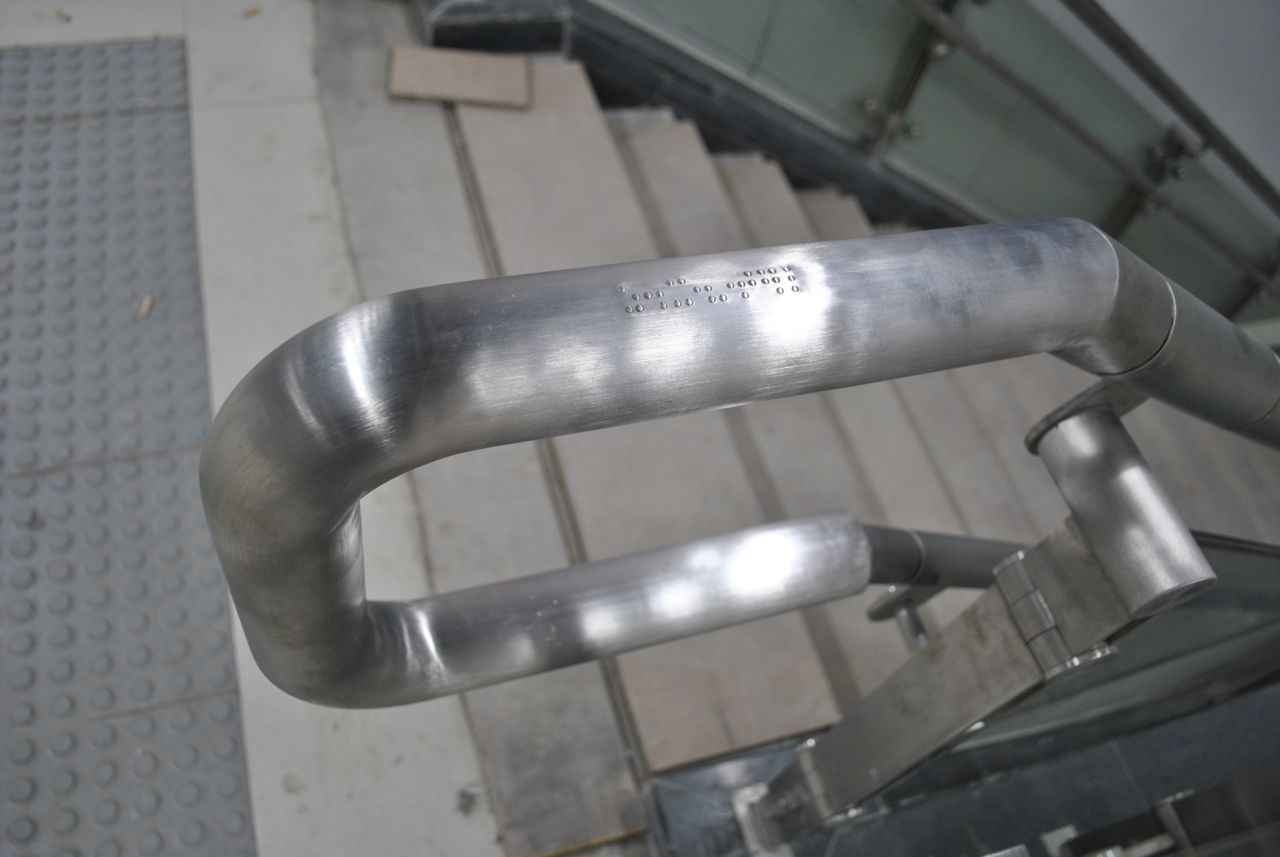
Braille

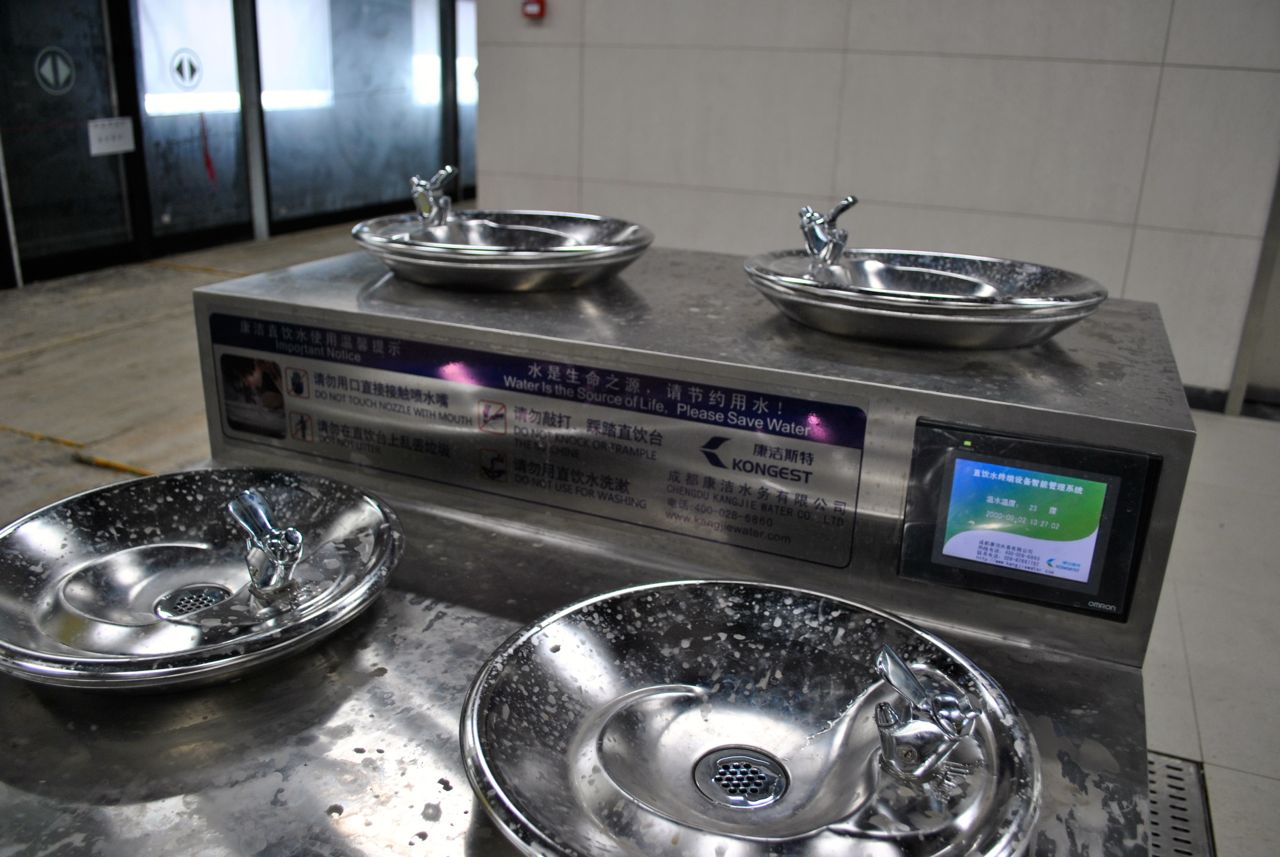
Drinking fountain

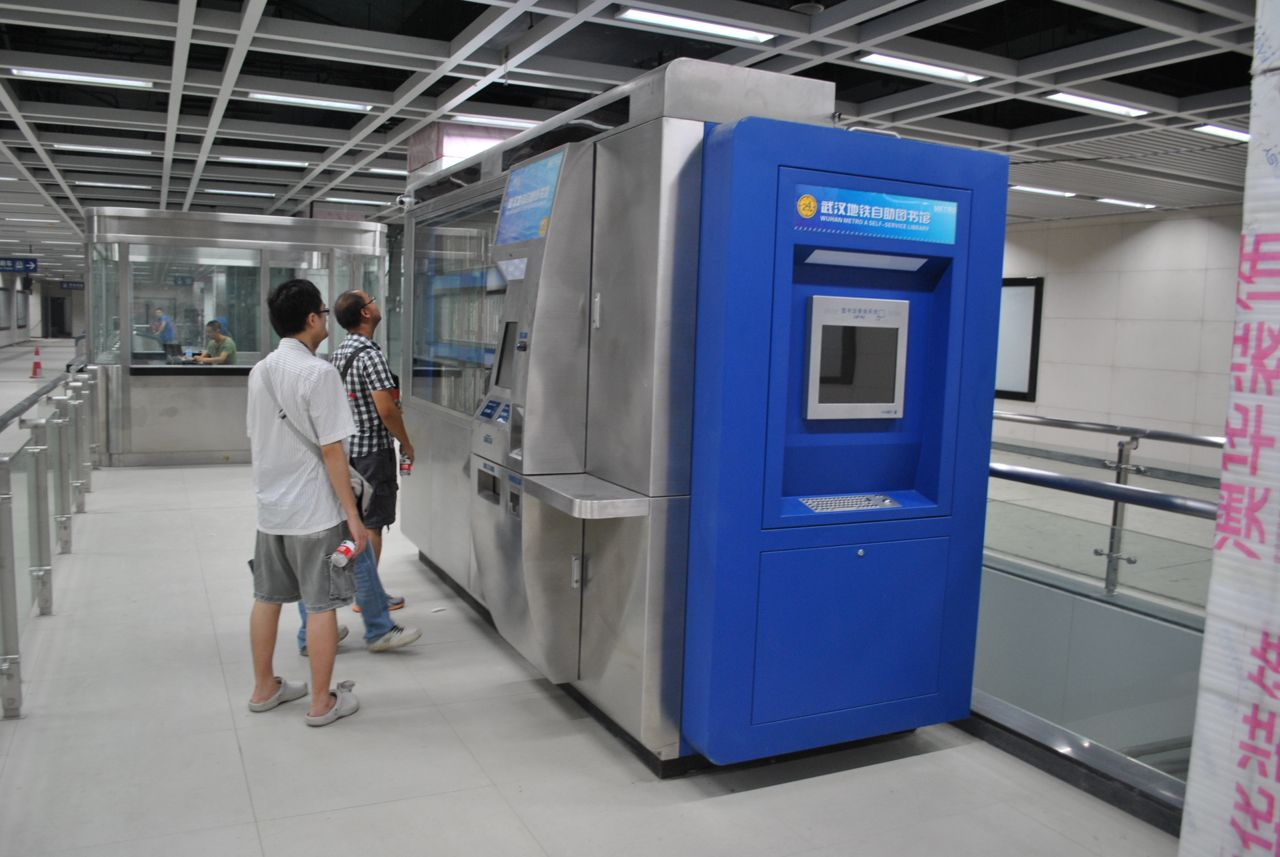
Self-service library
