= Xujiapeng station =

Metro station in Wuhan, China

Xujiapeng 徐家棚 metro
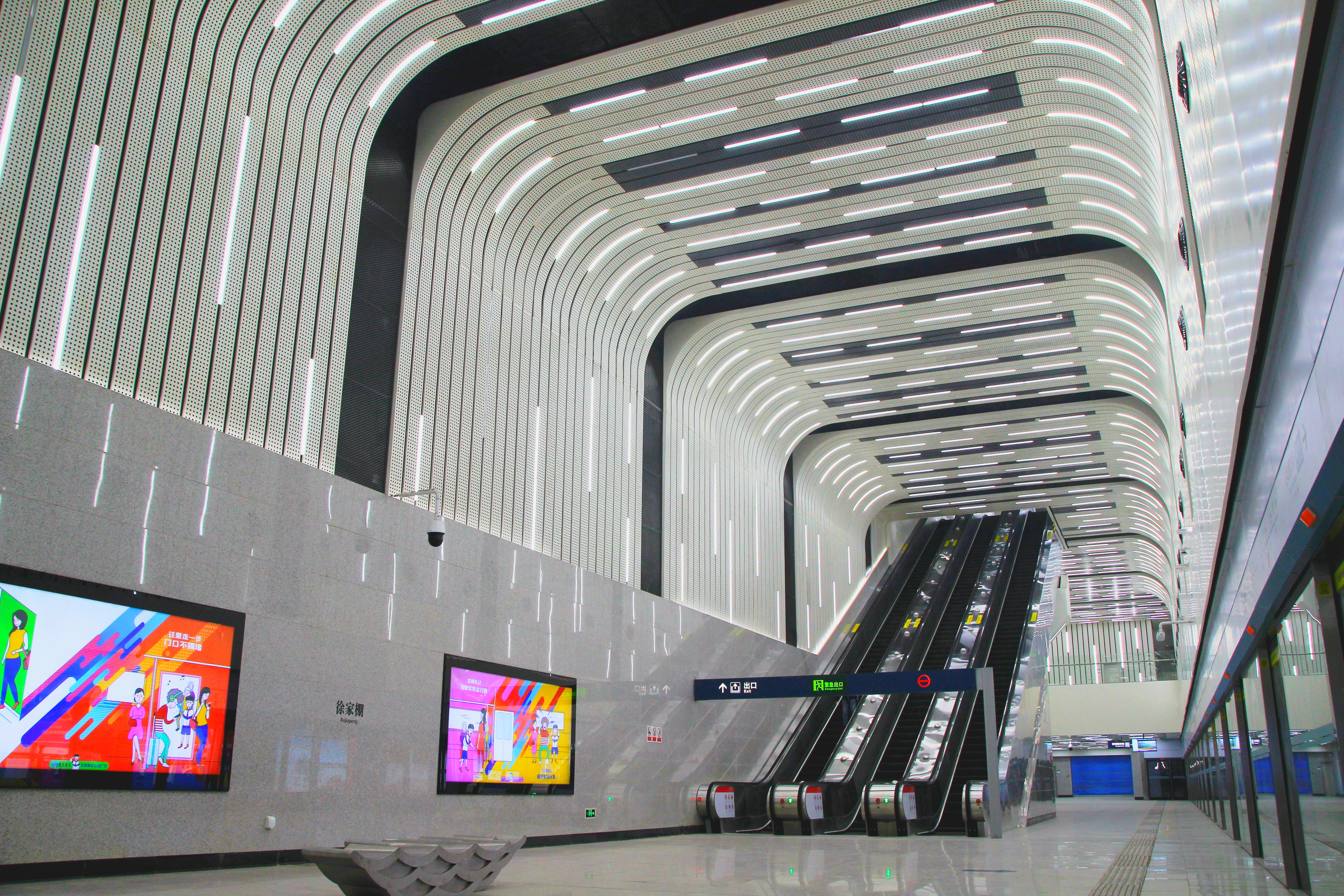

General information
- Location: Wuchang District, Wuhan, Hubei; China
- Coordinates: 30.59432°N 114.33003°E
- Operated by: Wuhan Metro Co., Ltd
- Lines: Line 5 Line 7 Line 8
- Platforms: 6 (3 island platforms, 2 side platforms)

Construction
- Structure type: Underground

History
- Opened: December 26, 2021 (Line 5); December 26, 2017 (Line 8); October 1, 2018 (Line 7)

Services
Preceding station	Wuhan Metro	Following station
Yangyuan & Tiesiyuan towards East Square of Wuhan Railway Station	Line 5	Sanjiao Road towards Hongxia
Sanyang Road towards Huangpi Square	Line 7	Hubei University towards Qinglongshan Ditiexiaozhen
Huangpu Road towards Jintan Road	Line 8	Xudong towards Military Athletes' Village
Location

Xujiapeng Station (Chinese: 徐家棚站) is a transfer station on Line 5, Line 7 and Line 8 of the Wuhan Metro in Wuhan, China. It entered revenue service on December 26, 2017, and is located in Wuchang District.

== Station layout ==
G	Entrances and Exits	Exits A-F, J-L, N, Q, R, T, V, W
B1	Concourse	Faregates, Station Agent
B2	Northbound	← Line 5 towards East Square of Wuhan Railway Station (Yangyuan & Tiesiyuan)
B2	Island platform, doors will open on the left
B2	Southbound	Line 5 towards Hongxia (Sanjiao Road) →
B3	Side platform, doors will open on the right
B3	Northbound	← Line 8 towards Jintan Road (Huangpu Road)
B3	Southbound	Line 8 towards Military Athletes' Village (Xudong) →
B3	Side platform, doors will open on the right
B4	Northbound	← Line 7 towards Huangpi Square (Sanyang Road)
B4	Island platform, doors will open on the left
B4	Southbound	Line 7 towards Qinglongshan Ditiexiaozhen (Hubei University) →

== Gallery ==
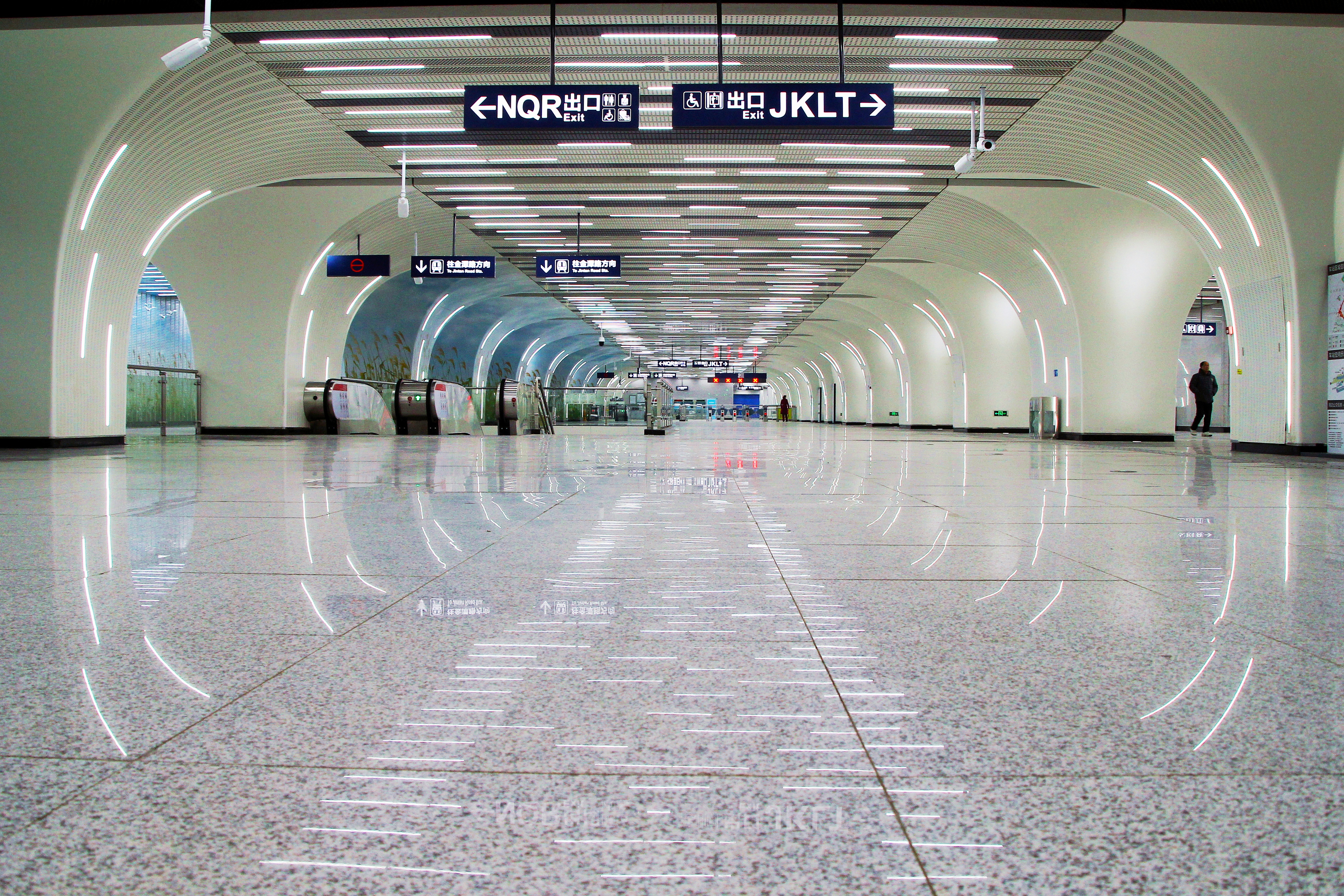
Concourse

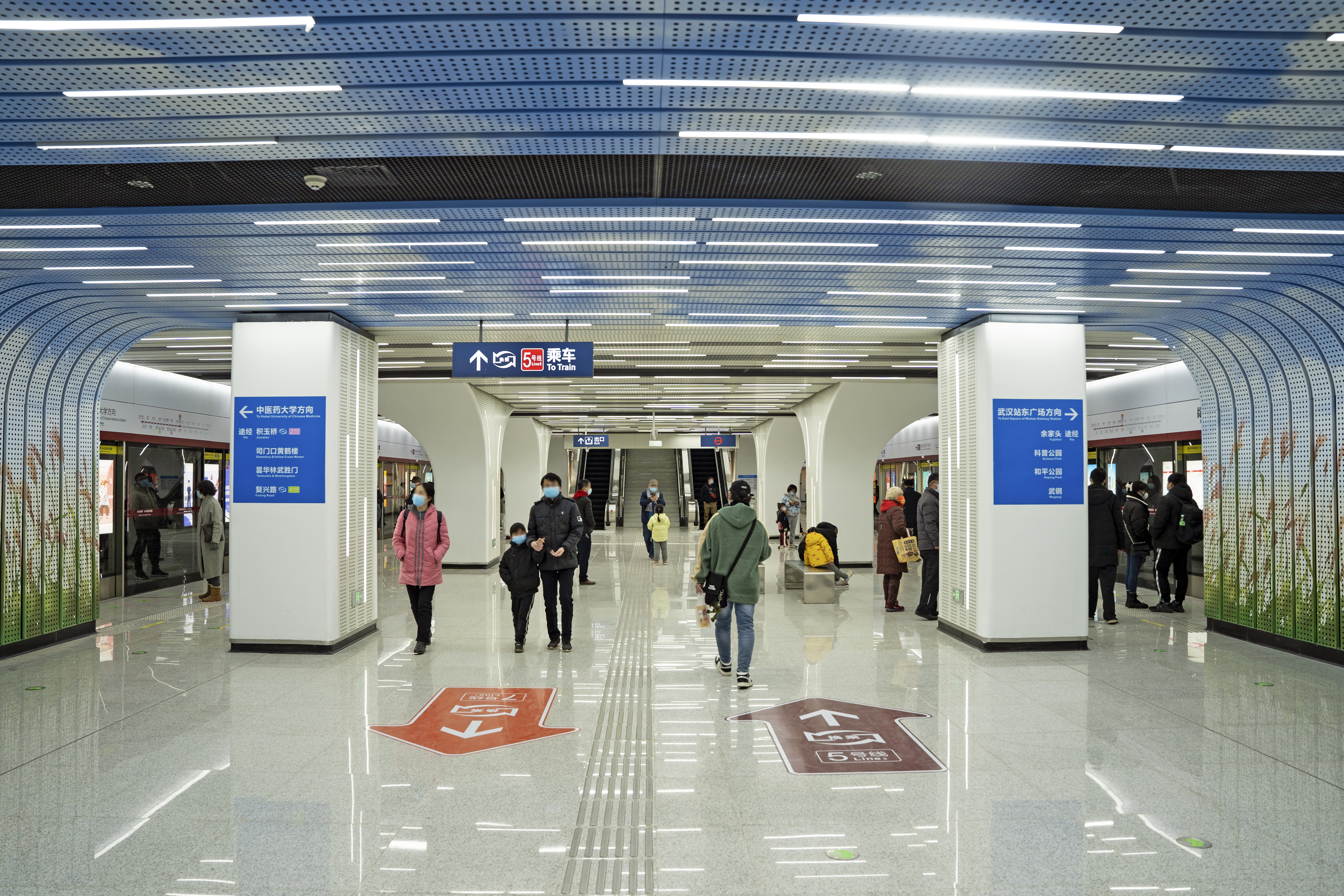
Line 5 platform

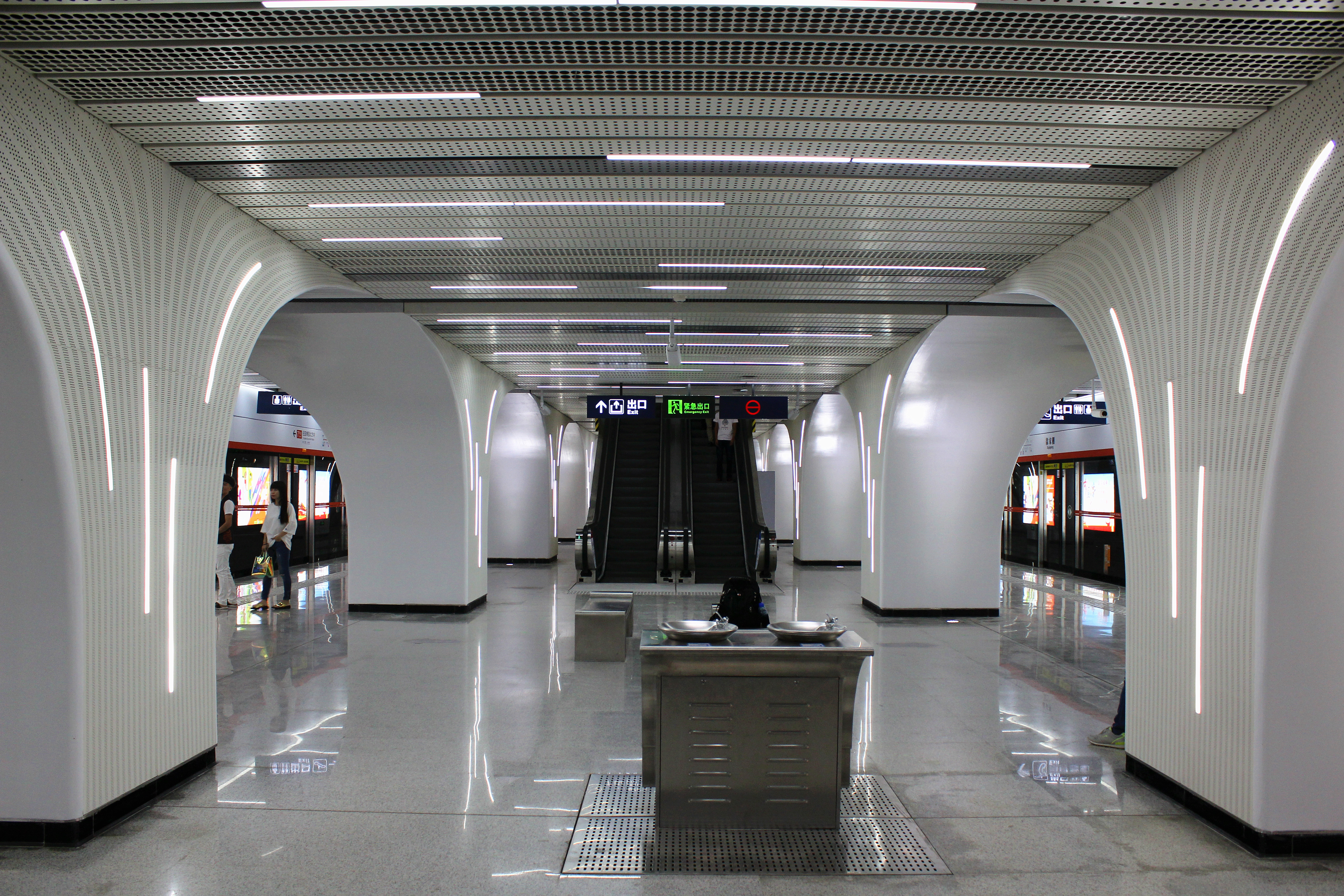
Line 7 platform

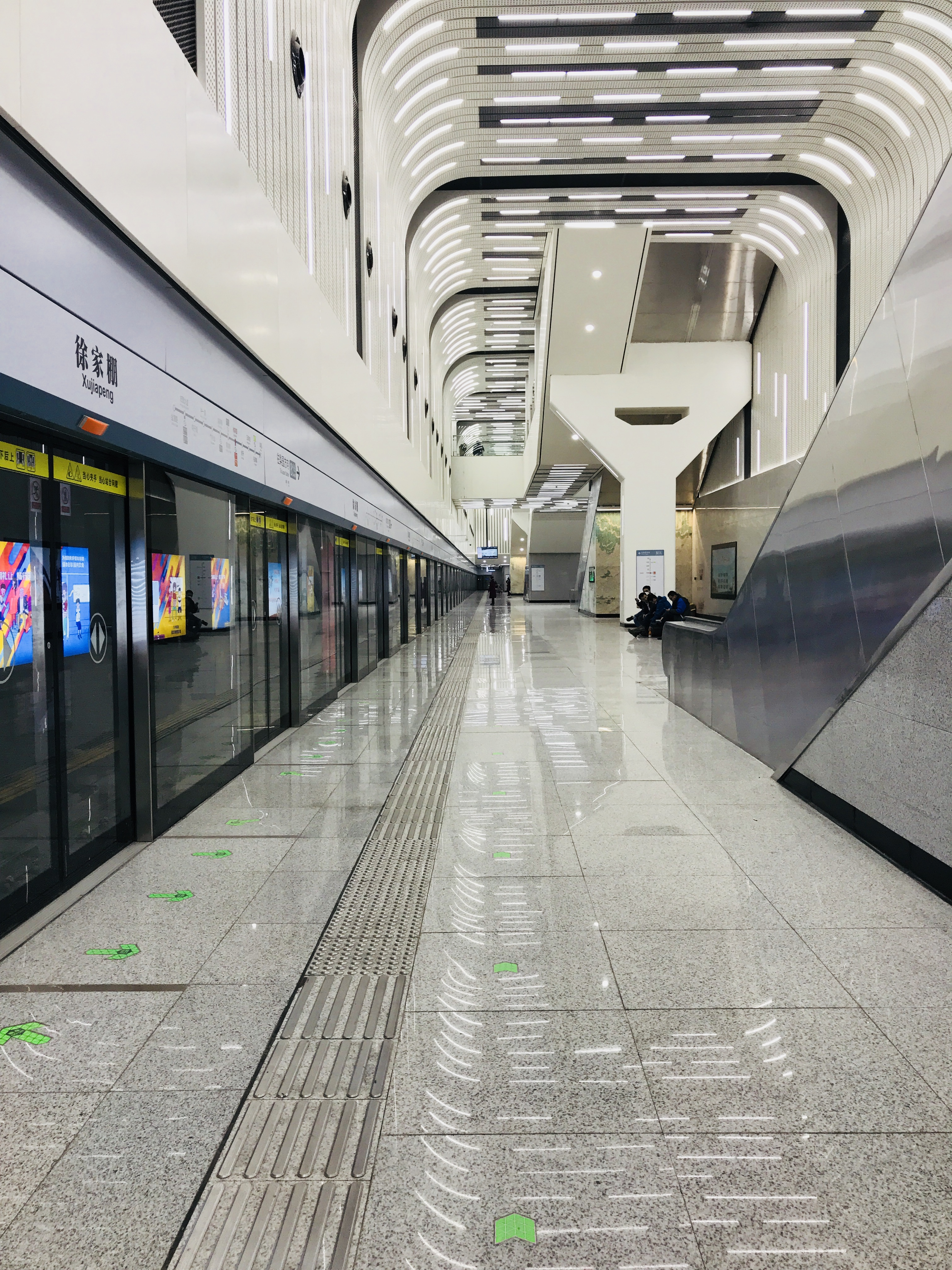
Line 8 platform
