= Xiaoguishan station =

Wuhan Metro station

Xiaoguishan 小龟山 metro
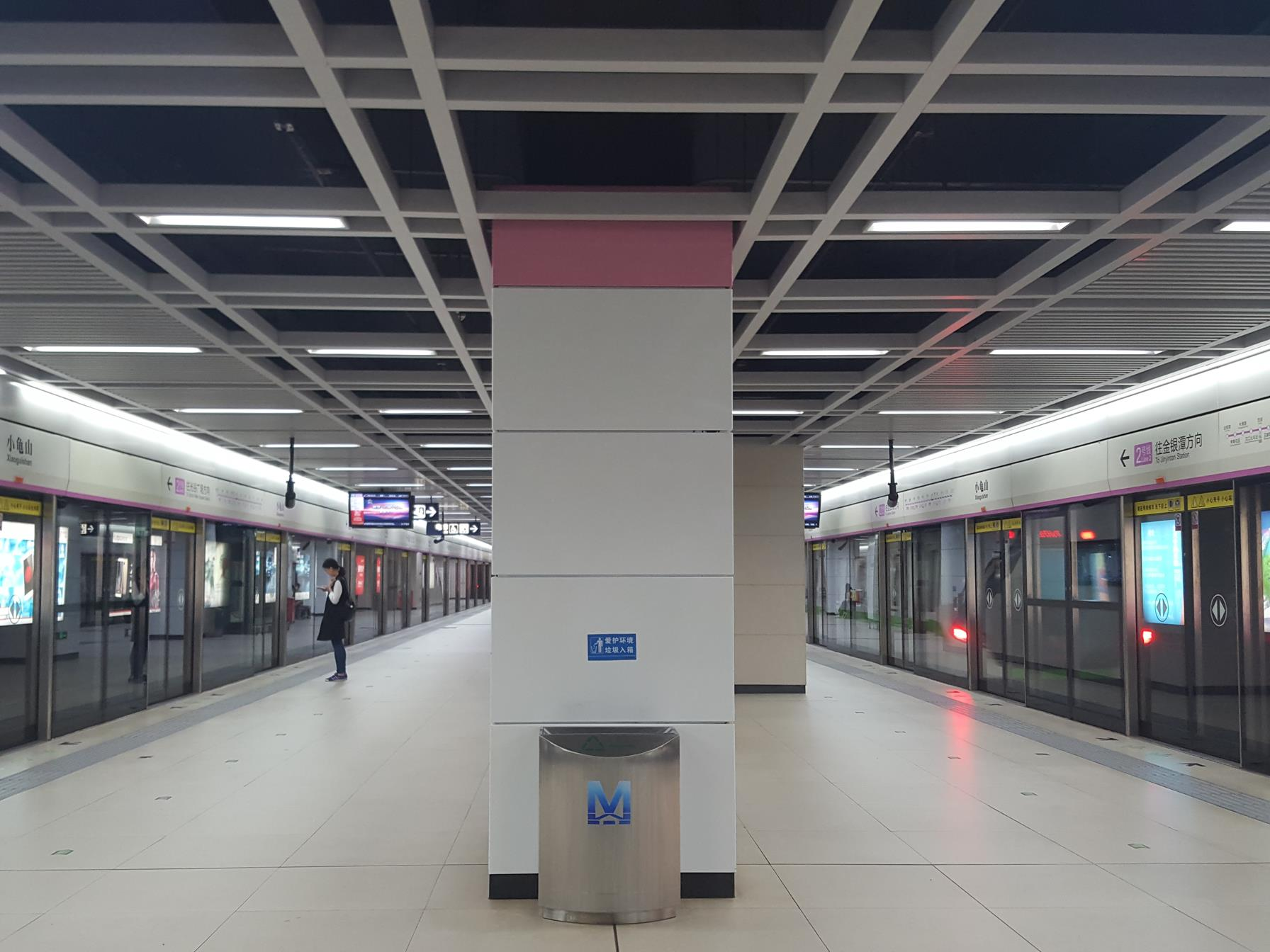

General information
- Location: Wuchang District, Wuhan, Hubei; China
- Coordinates: 30°33′14″N 114°19′13″E
- Operated by: Wuhan Metro Co., Ltd
- Line: Line 2
- Platforms: 2 (1 island platform)

Construction
- Structure type: Underground

History
- Opened: December 28, 2012 (Line 2)

Services
Preceding station	Wuhan Metro	Following station
Pangxiejia towards Tianhe International Airport	Line 2	Hongshan Square towards Fozuling
Location

Xiaoguishan Station (Chinese: 小龟山站) is a station of Line 2 of Wuhan Metro. It entered revenue service on December 28, 2012. It is located in Wuchang District. The previous name is South Tiyu Road Station.

== Station layout ==
G	Entrances and Exits	Exits A-D
B1	Concourse	Faregates, Station Agent
B2	Northbound	← Line 2 towards Tianhe International Airport (Pangxiejia)
B2	Island platform, doors will open on the left
B2	Southbound	Line 2 towards Fozuling (Hongshan Square) →

== Gallery ==
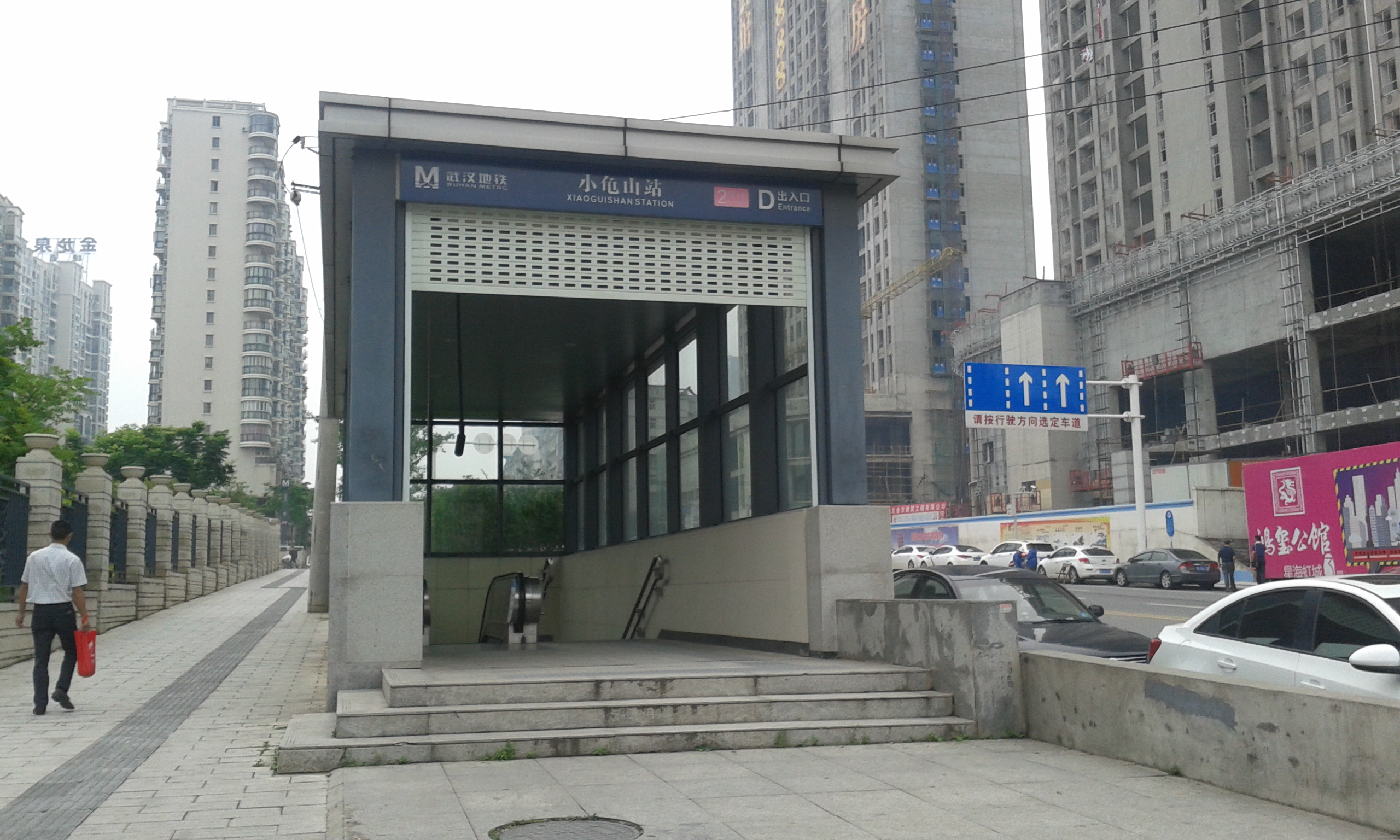
Entrance D

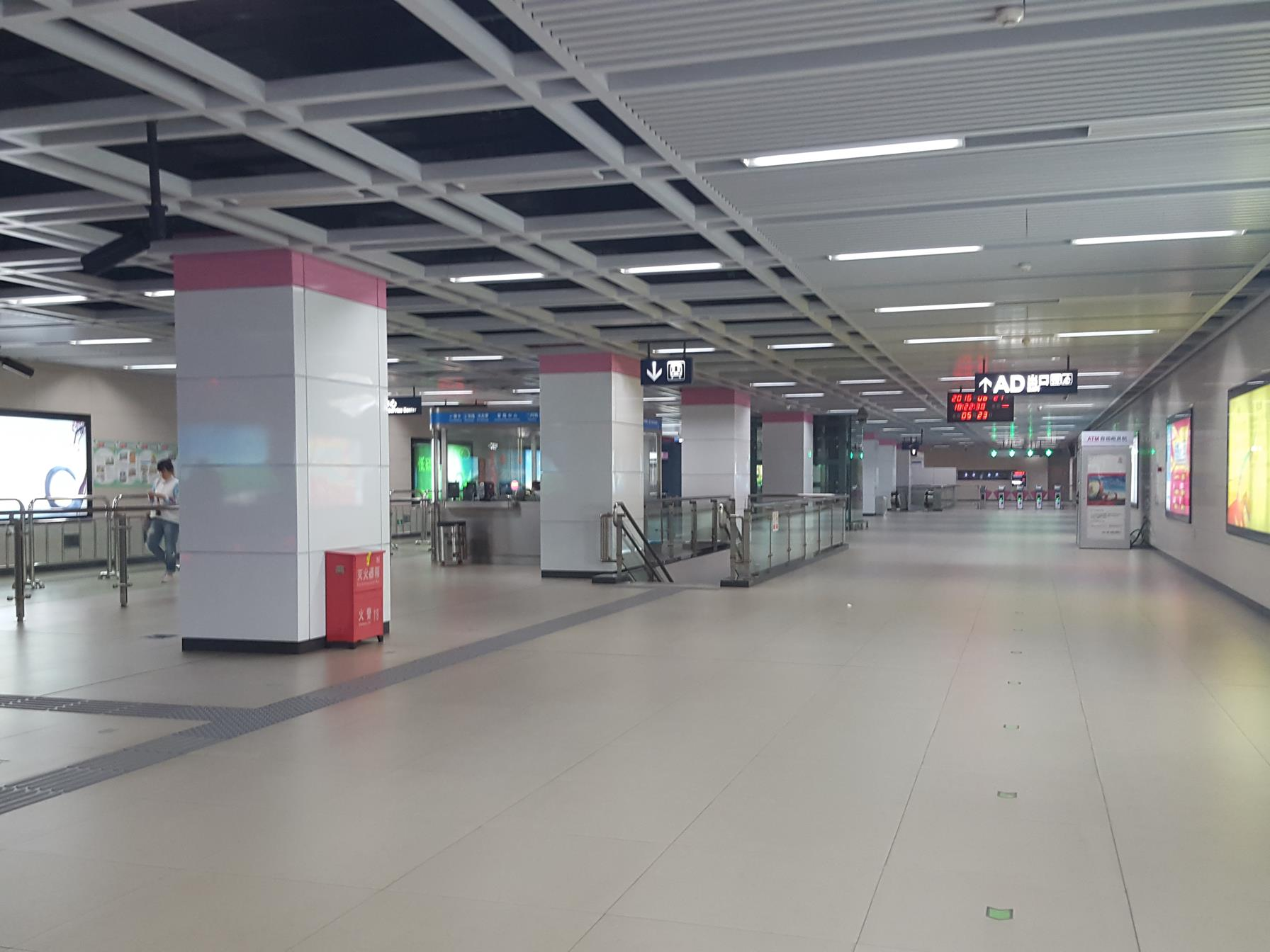
Concourse
