= Jianghan Road station (Wuhan Metro) =

Wuhan Metro station

Jianghan Road 江汉路 metro
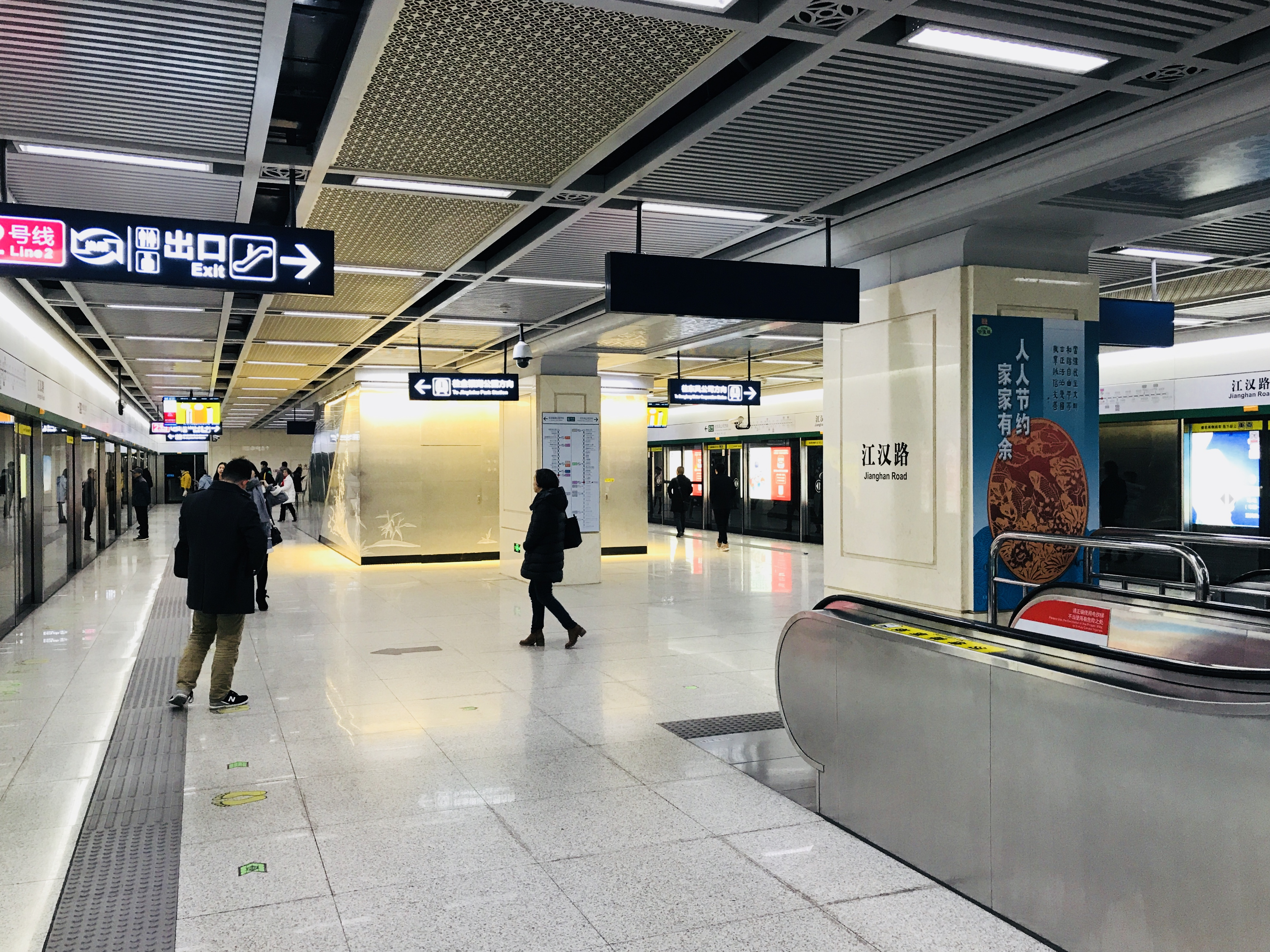
- Line 6 platform

General information
- Location: Jianghan District, Wuhan, Hubei; China
- Coordinates: 30°34′56″N 114°17′13″E
- Operator: Wuhan Metro Co., Ltd
- Lines: Line 2; Line 6
- Platforms: 4 (2 island platforms)

Construction
- Structure type: Underground

History
- Opened: December 28, 2012 (Line 2); December 28, 2016 (Line 6)

Services
Preceding station	Wuhan Metro	Following station
Xunlimen towards Tianhe International Airport	Line 2	Jiyuqiao towards Fozuling
Dazhi Road towards Xincheng 11th Road	Line 6	Liuduqiao towards Dongfeng Motor Corporation
Location

Jianghan Road Station (Chinese: 江汉路站) is an interchange station on Line 2 and Line 6 of the Wuhan Metro. It entered revenue service on December 28, 2012. It is located in Jianghan District.

This station was sponsored by Zhouheiya (Chinese: 周黑鸭), but the sponsorship has ended.

== Station layout ==
G	Entrances and Exits	Exits A-H, J
B1	Concourse	Shops
B2	Concourse	Faregates, Station Agent
B3	Northbound	← Line 6 towards Xincheng 11th Road (Dazhi Road)
B3	Island platform, doors will open on the left
B3	Southbound	Line 6 towards Dongfeng Motor Corporation (Liuduqiao) →
B4	Northbound	← Line 2 towards Tianhe International Airport (Xunlimen)
B4	Island platform, doors will open on the left
B4	Southbound	Line 2 towards Fozuling (Jiyuqiao) →

== Gallery ==
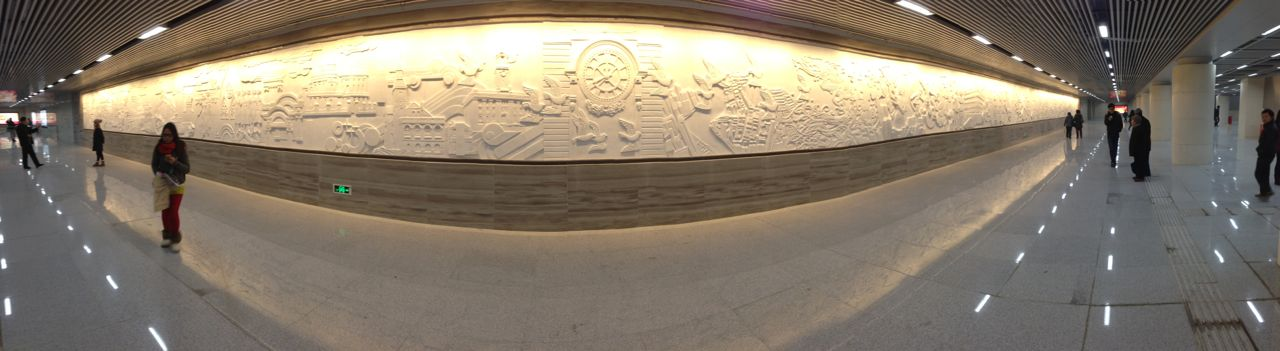
Panorama view of the wall
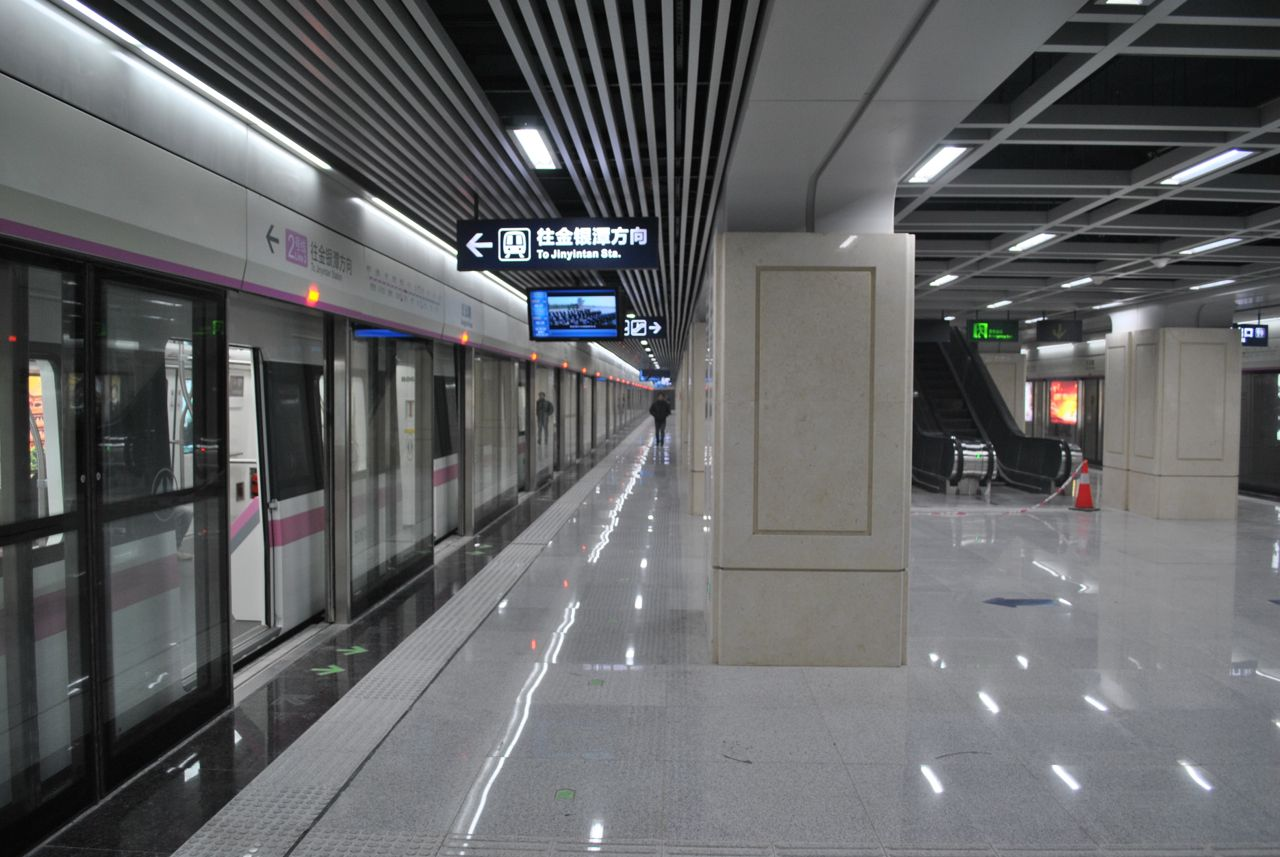
Line 2 platform

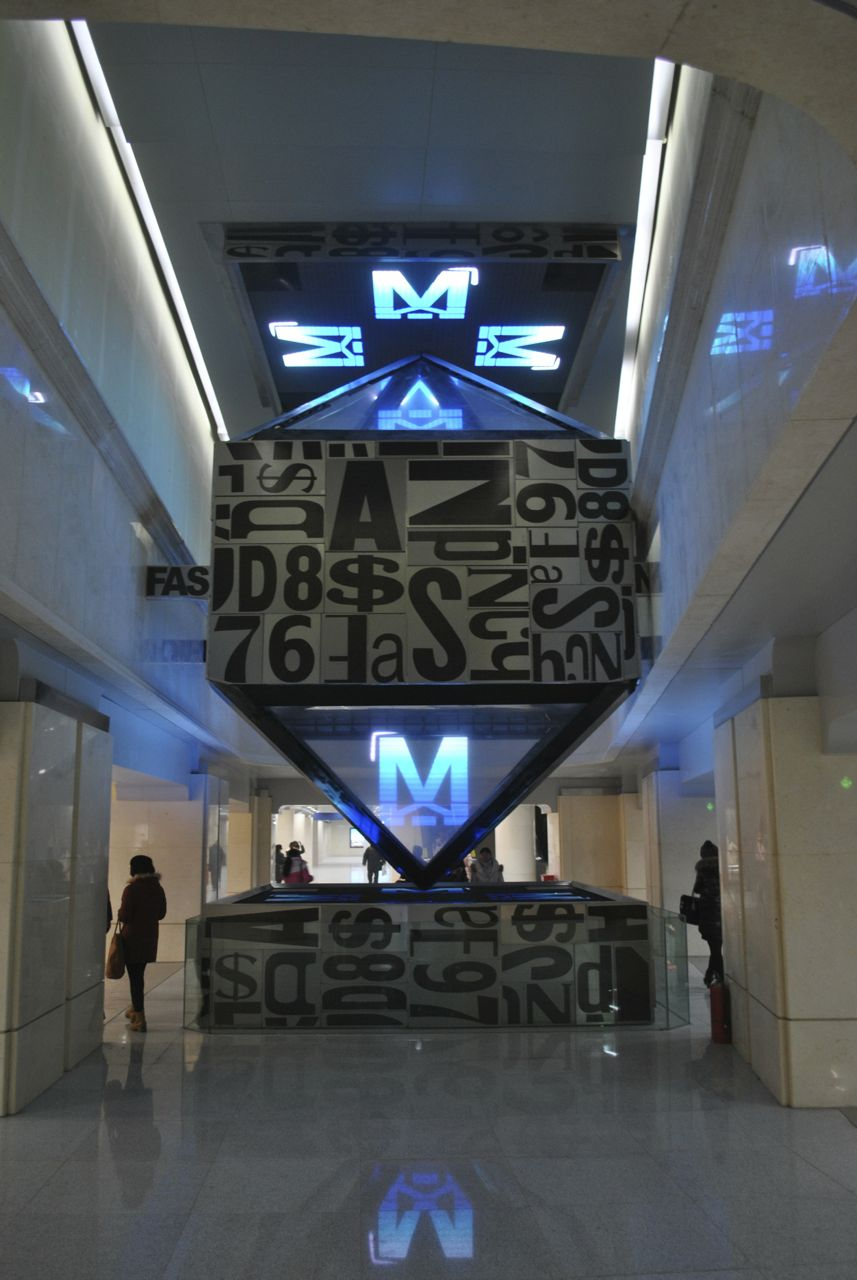
3D Projector

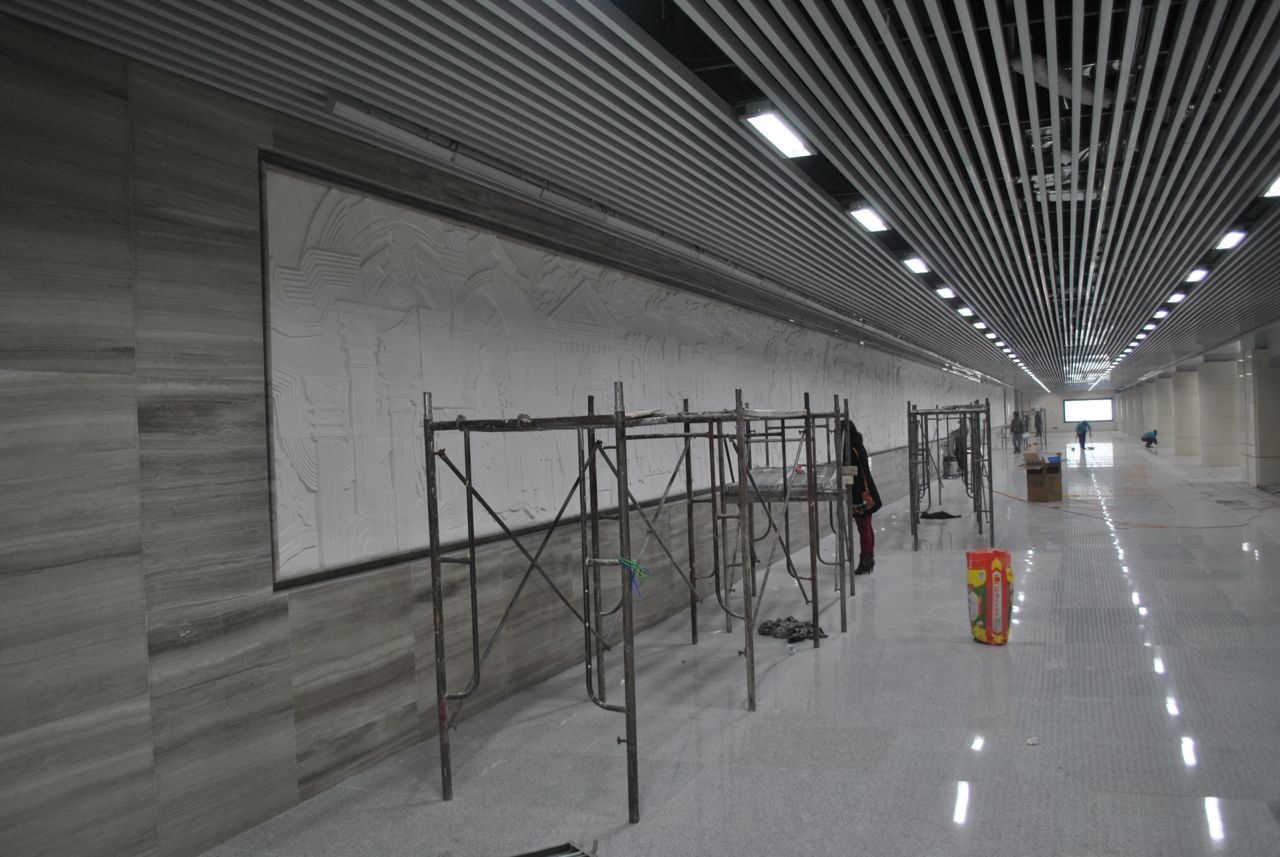
Wall

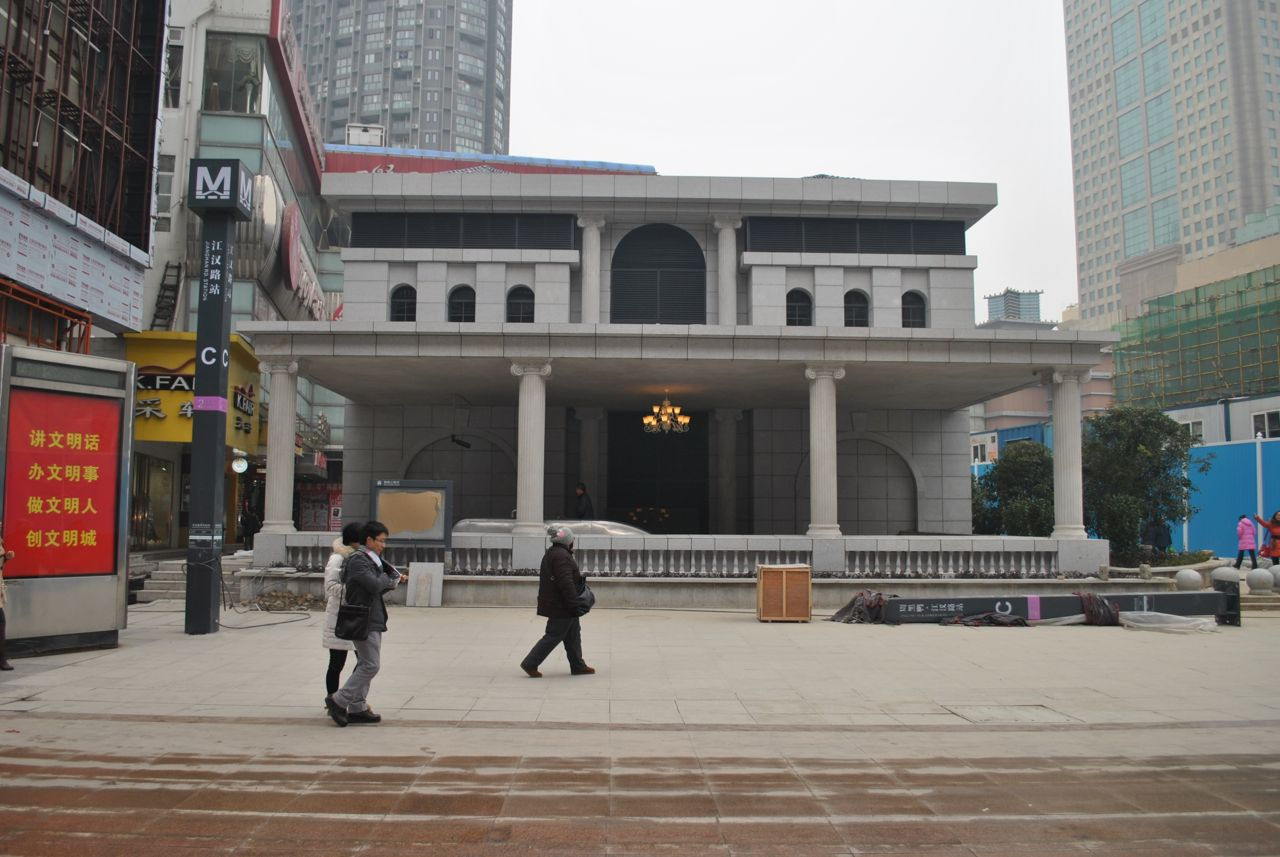
Exit C
