= Sanjiao Road station =

Metro station in Wuhan, China

Sanjiao Road 三角路 metro
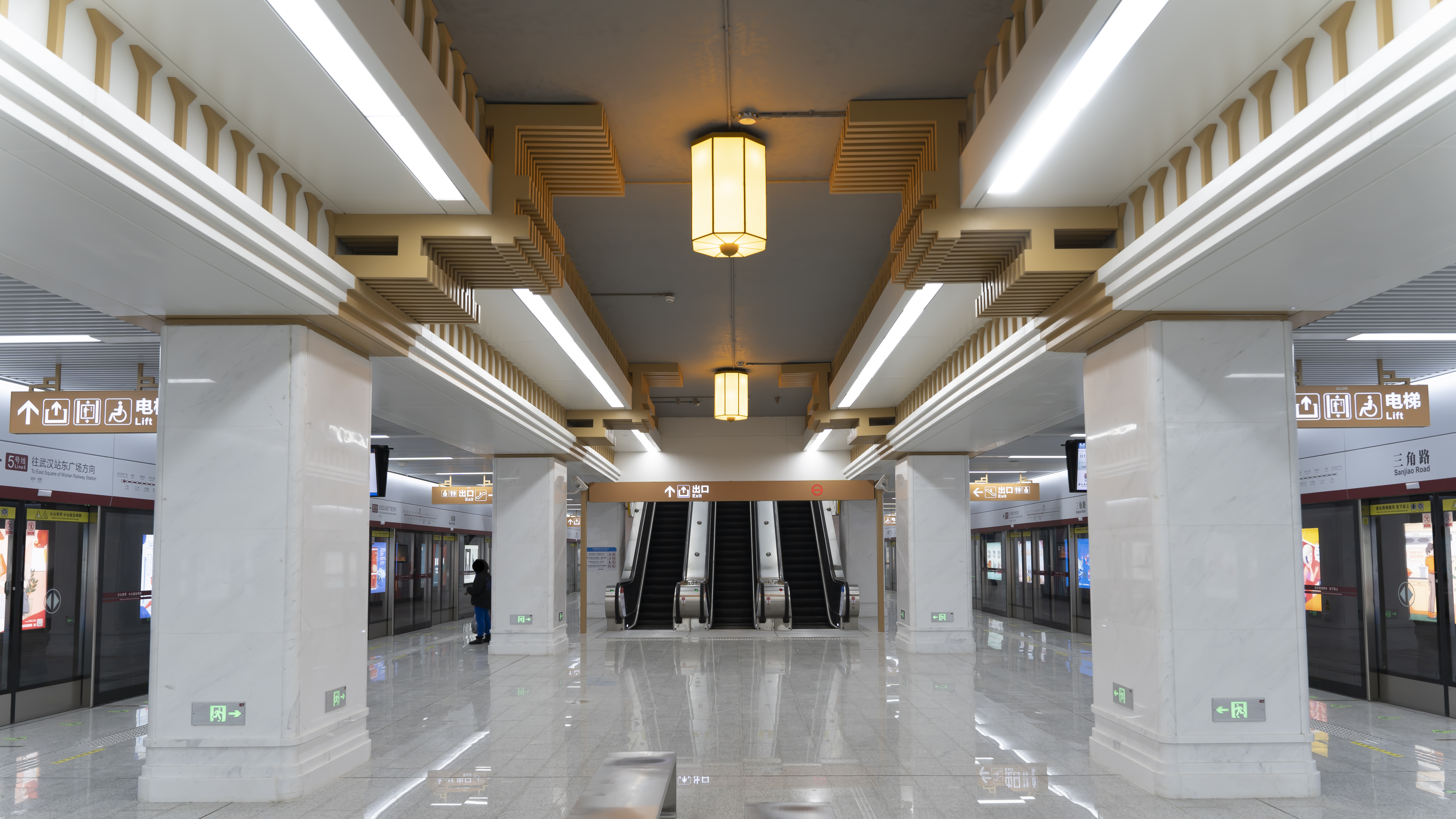

General information
- Location: Wuchang District, Wuhan, Hubei; China
- Operated by: Wuhan Metro Co., Ltd
- Line: Line 5

Construction
- Structure type: Underground

History
- Opened: December 26, 2021

Services
Preceding station	Wuhan Metro	Following station
Xujiapeng towards East Square of Wuhan Railway Station	Line 5	Sancenglou towards Hongxia
Location

Sanjiao Road Station (Chinese: 三角路站) is a station on Line 5 of the Wuhan Metro in Wuhan, China. The station entered revenue service on 26 December 2021. As of 2024, the station area director is Qin Wanchen (秦万晨).

== Architecture ==
The station's design is inspired by Wuhan's history, with a design theme of “the flourishing textile city" (纺市繁华). A reporter for The Paper said that the station had "a simple and refined style of historical architecture, displayed with modern artistic skill".

The station has eight exits. Exits A, B, C, and D were opened first, whereas exits E, F, G, and H were not opened until a considerable period of time after they were constructed. According to a staff member from Wuhan Metro Group, the delay was because the underground shopping street connected to the exits still needed improvements.
