= Wuhan Metro =

Rapid transit system for Wuhan

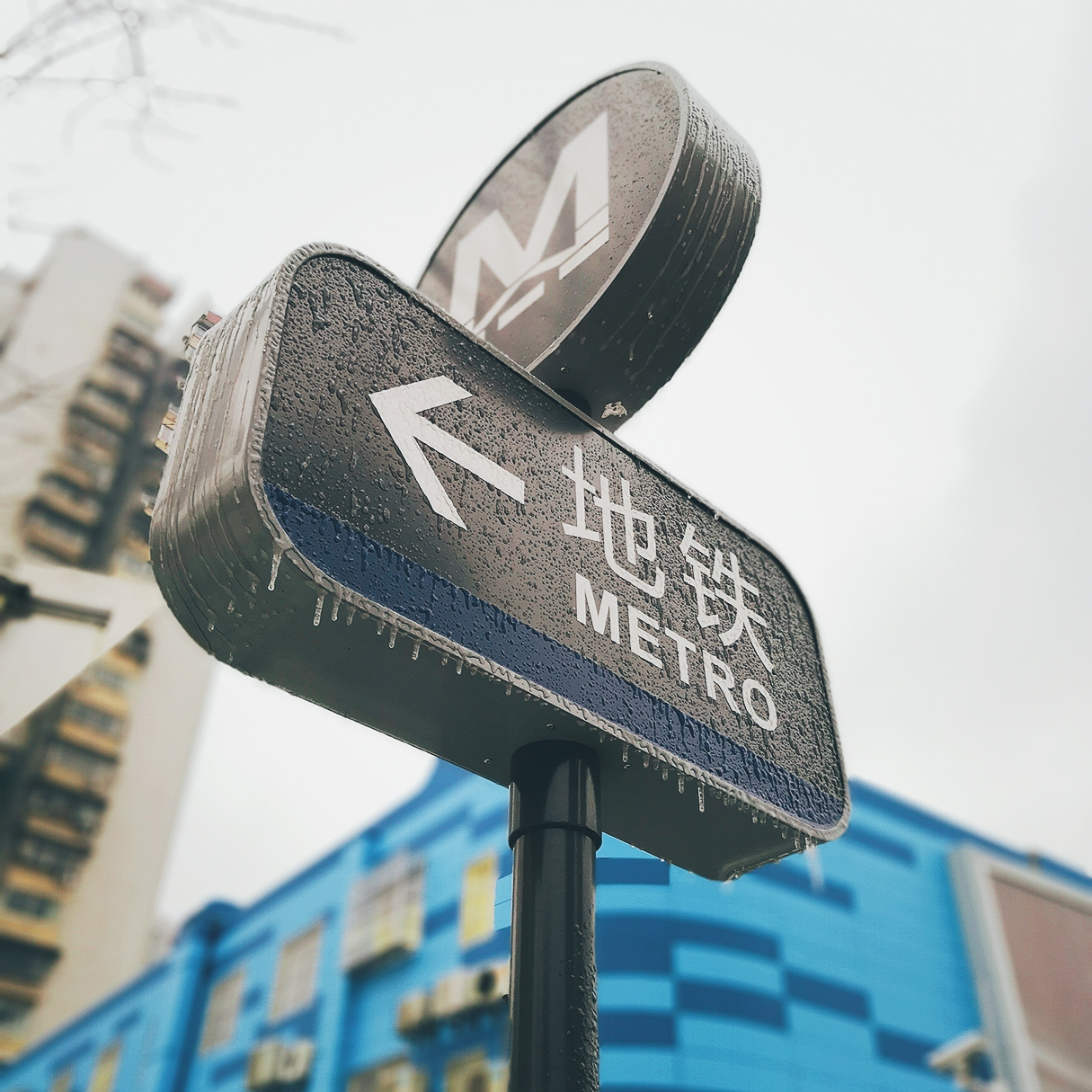
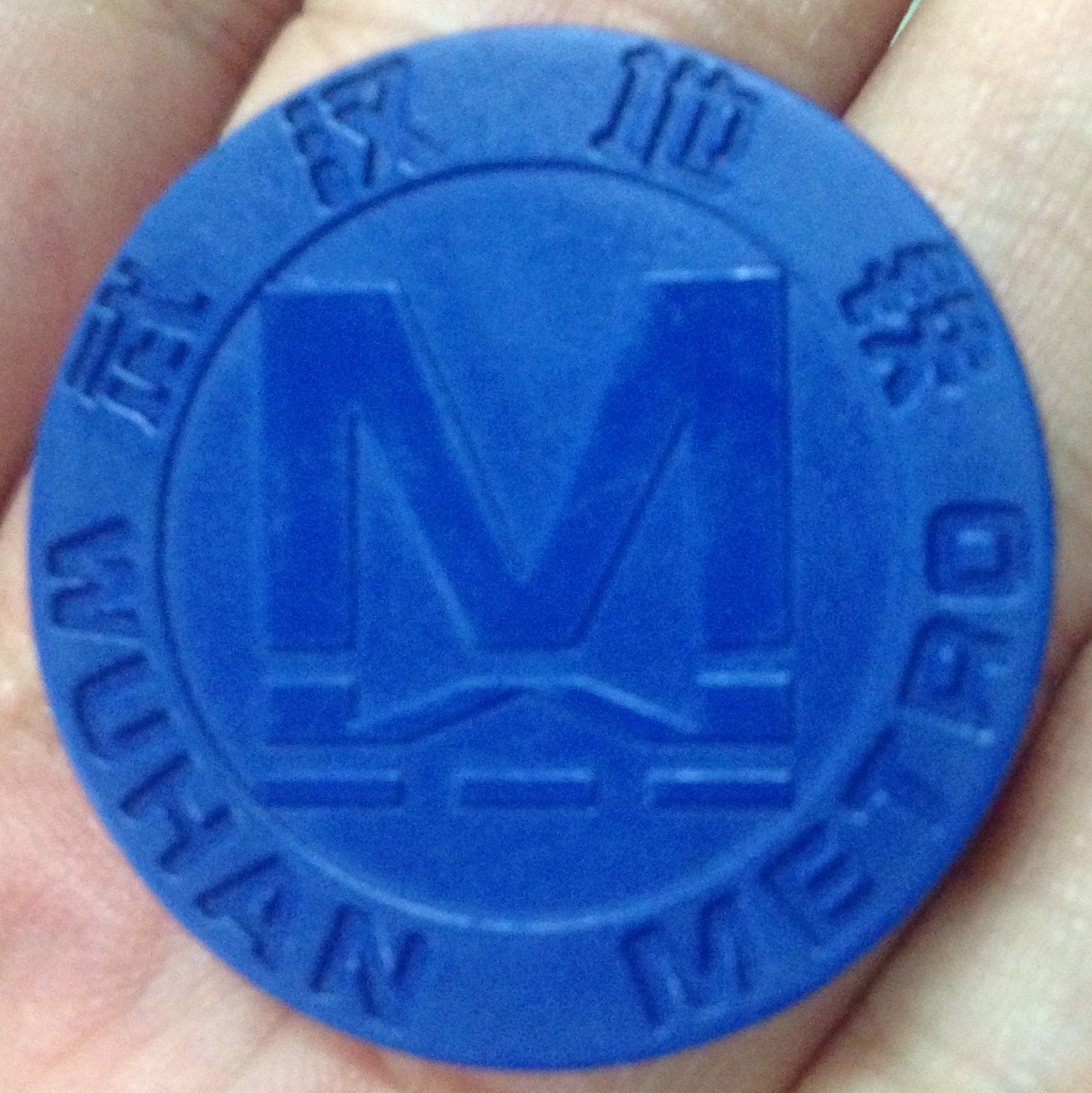
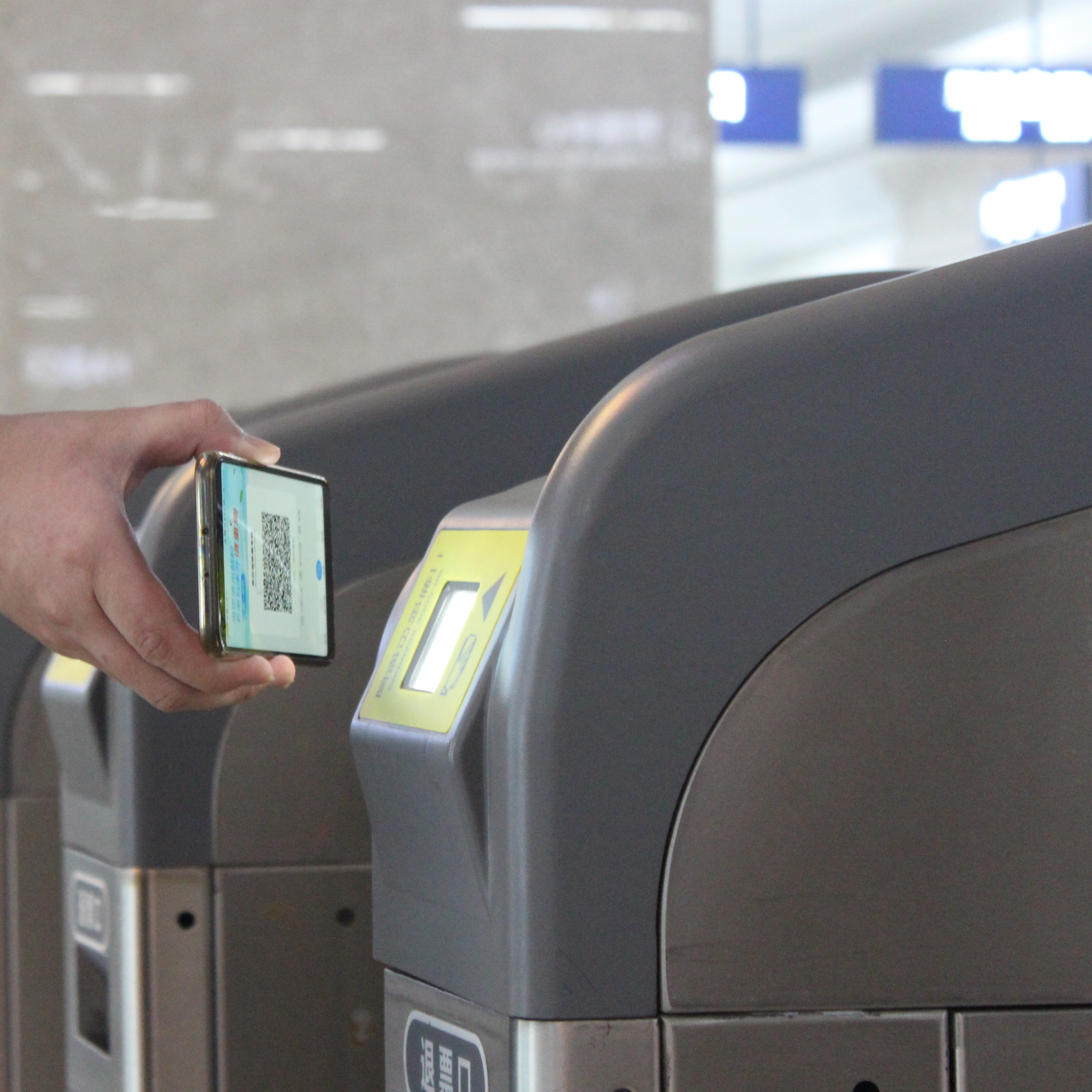
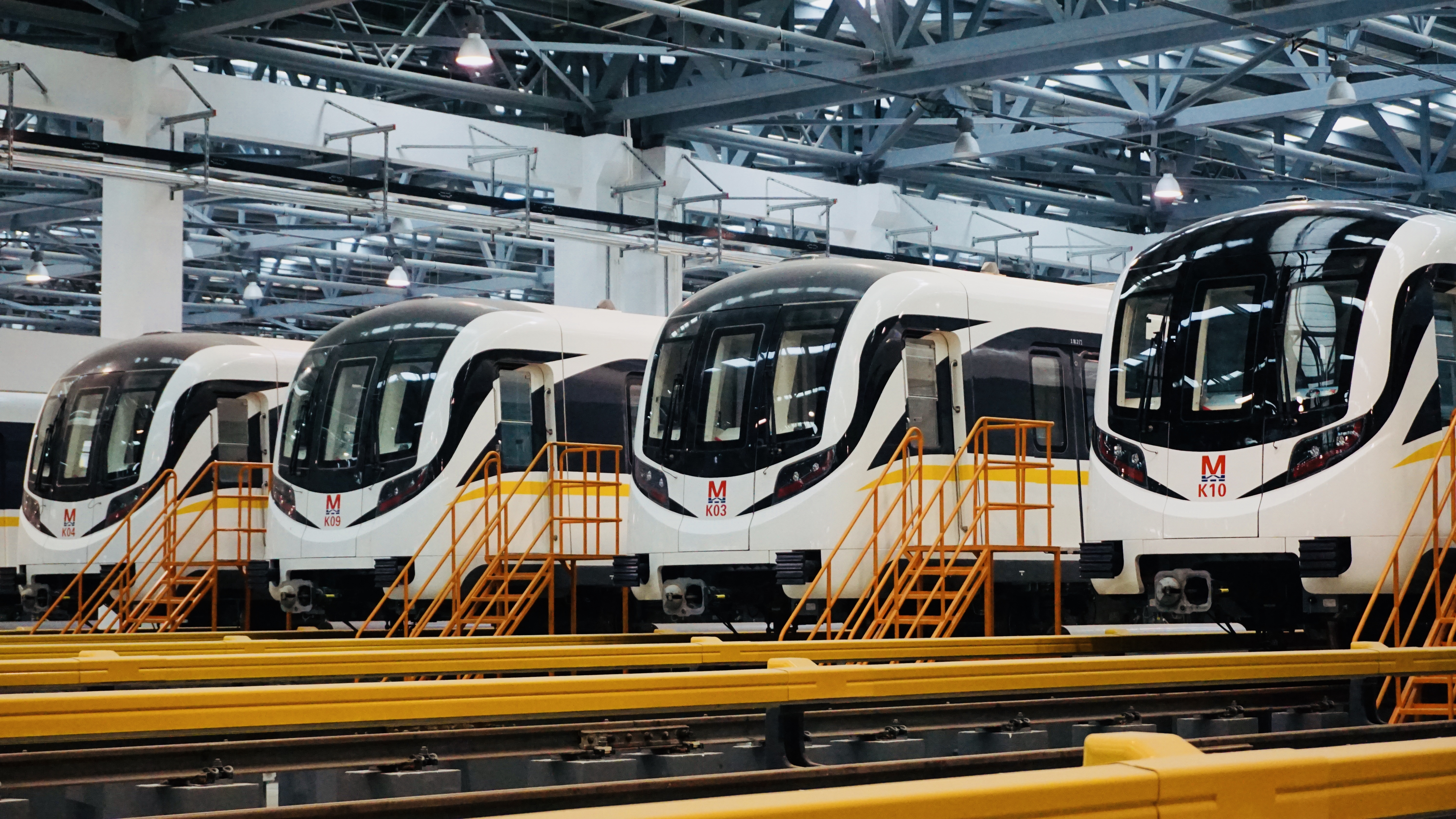
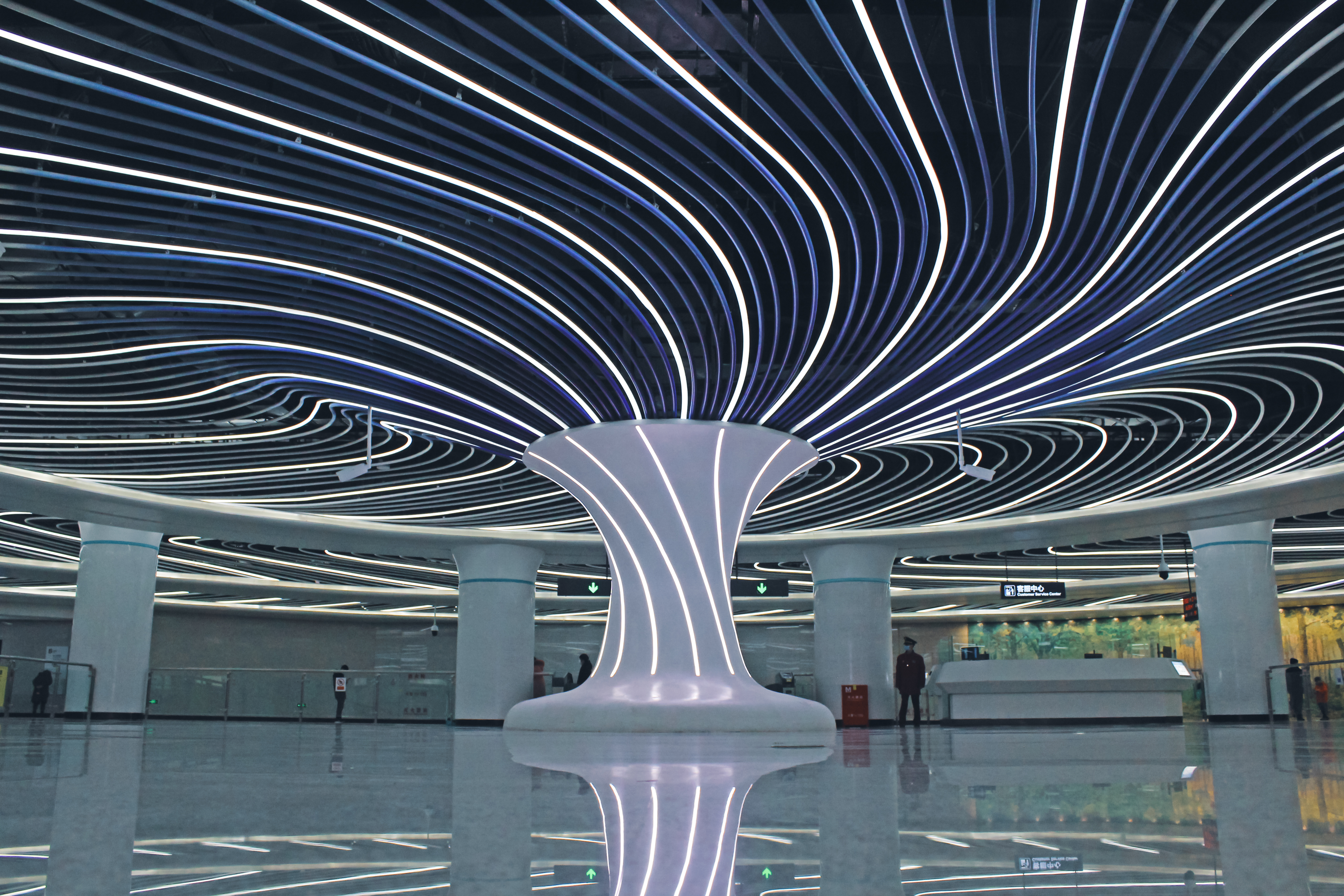
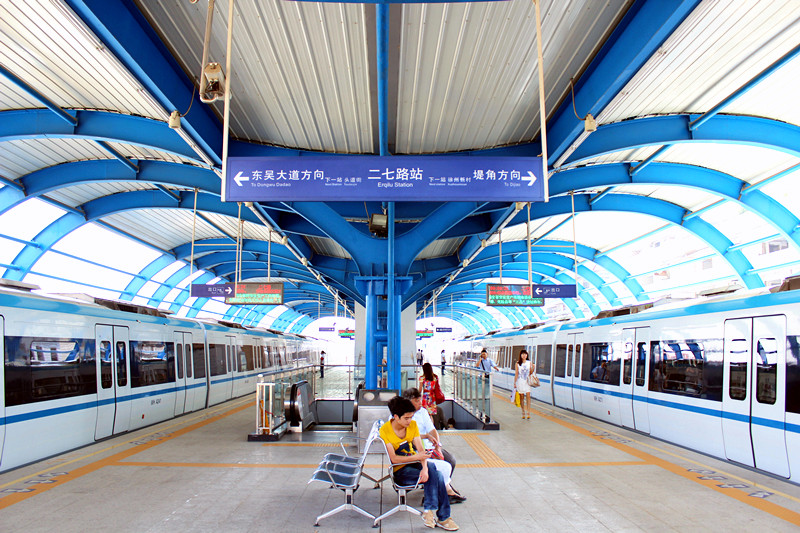
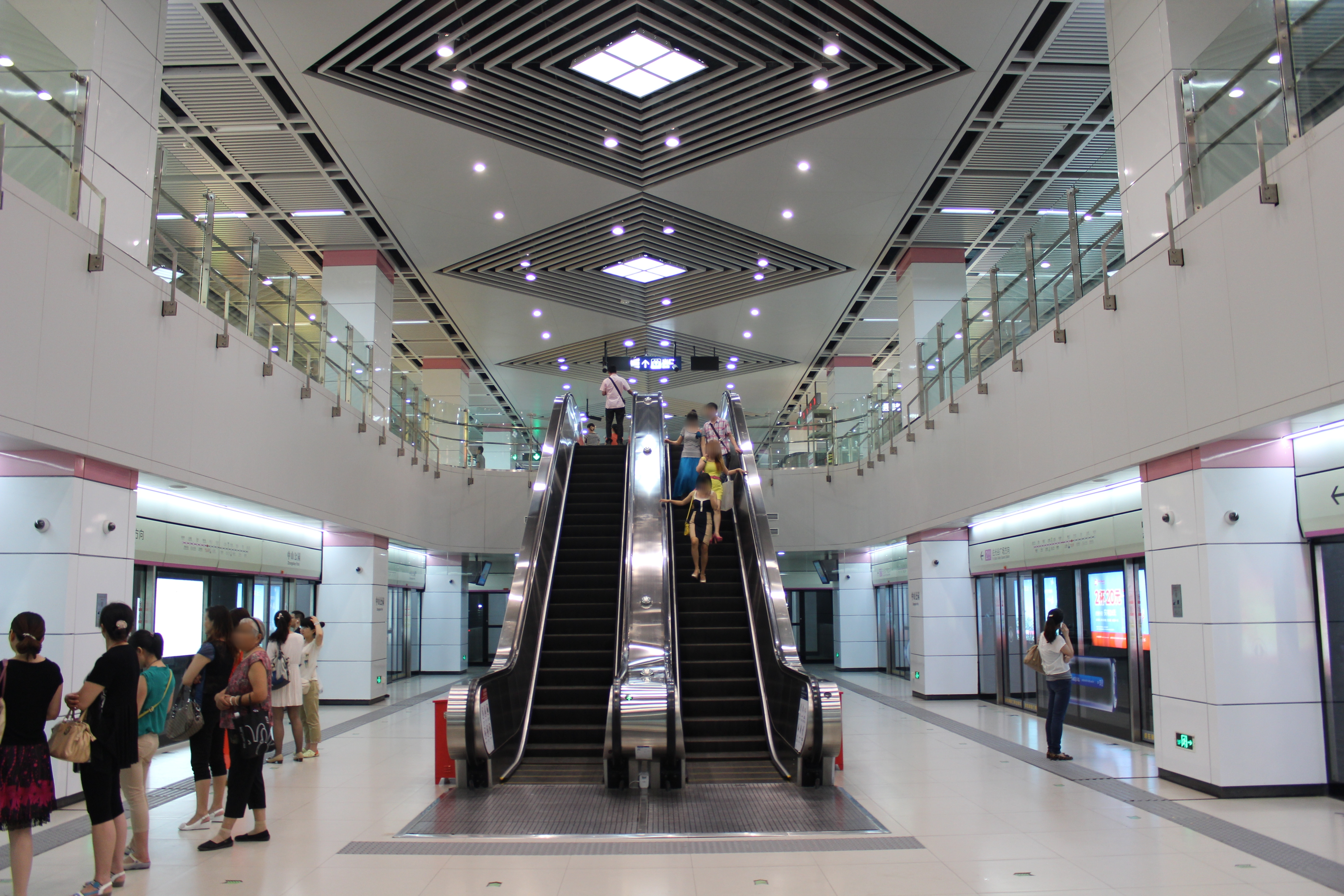
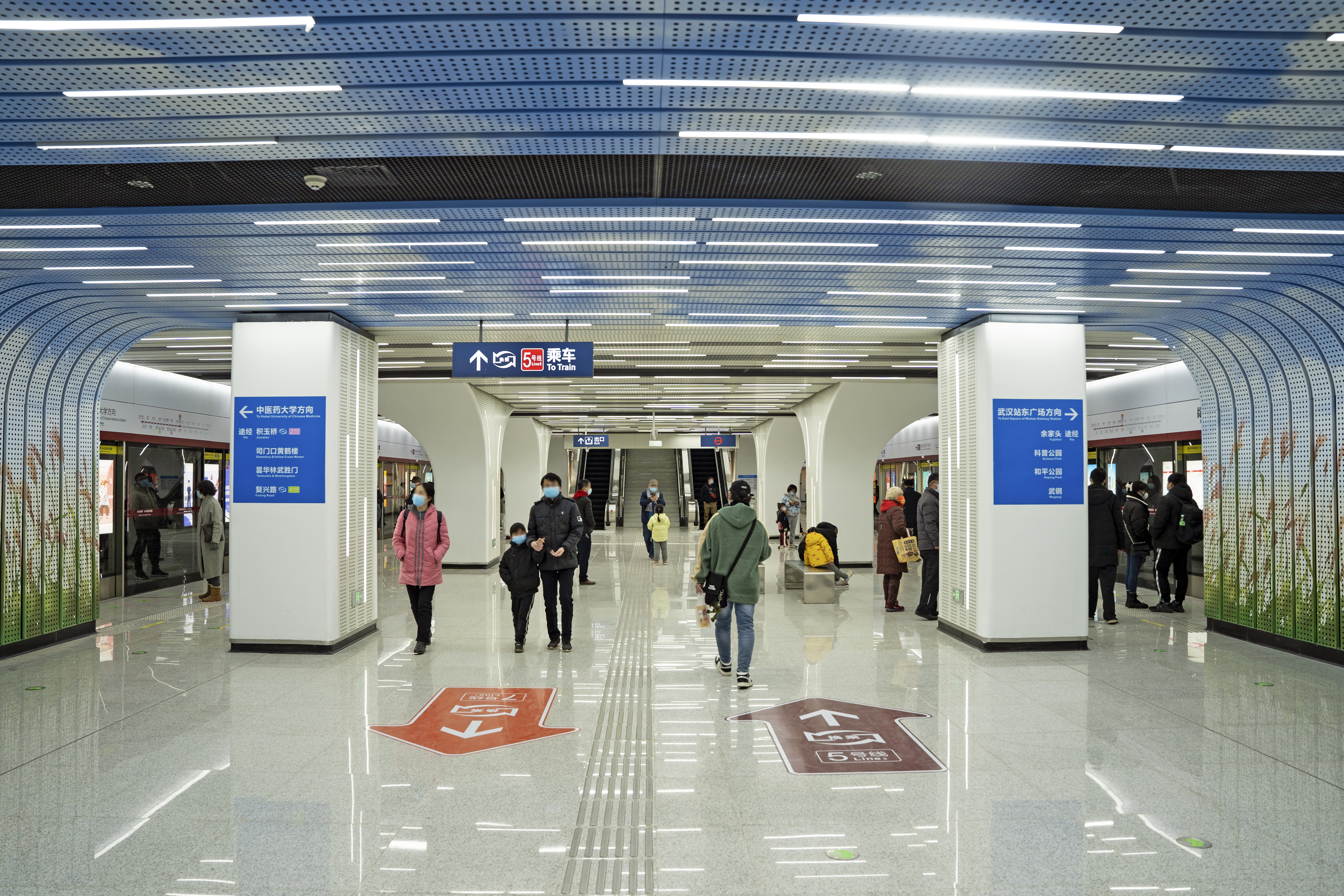
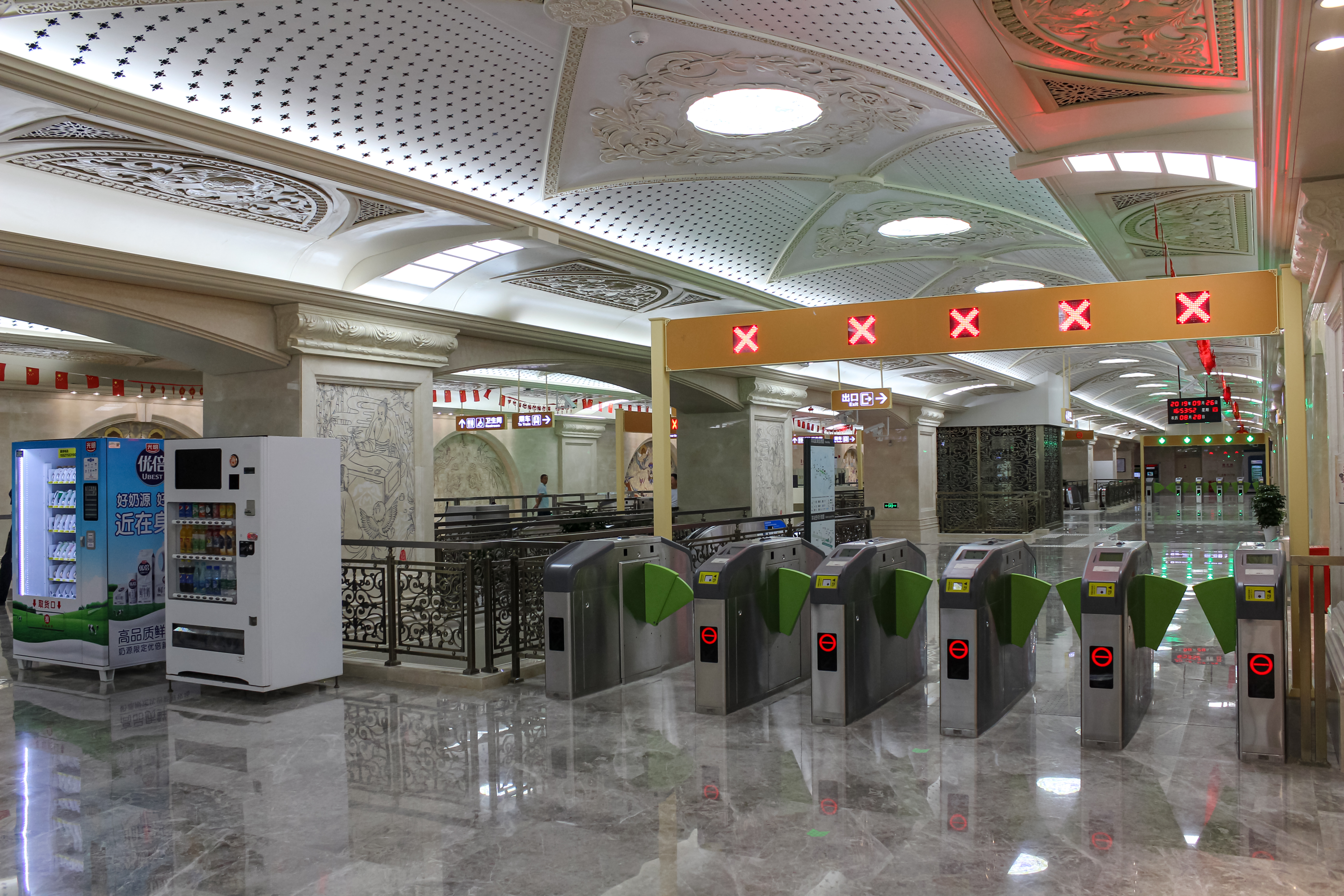
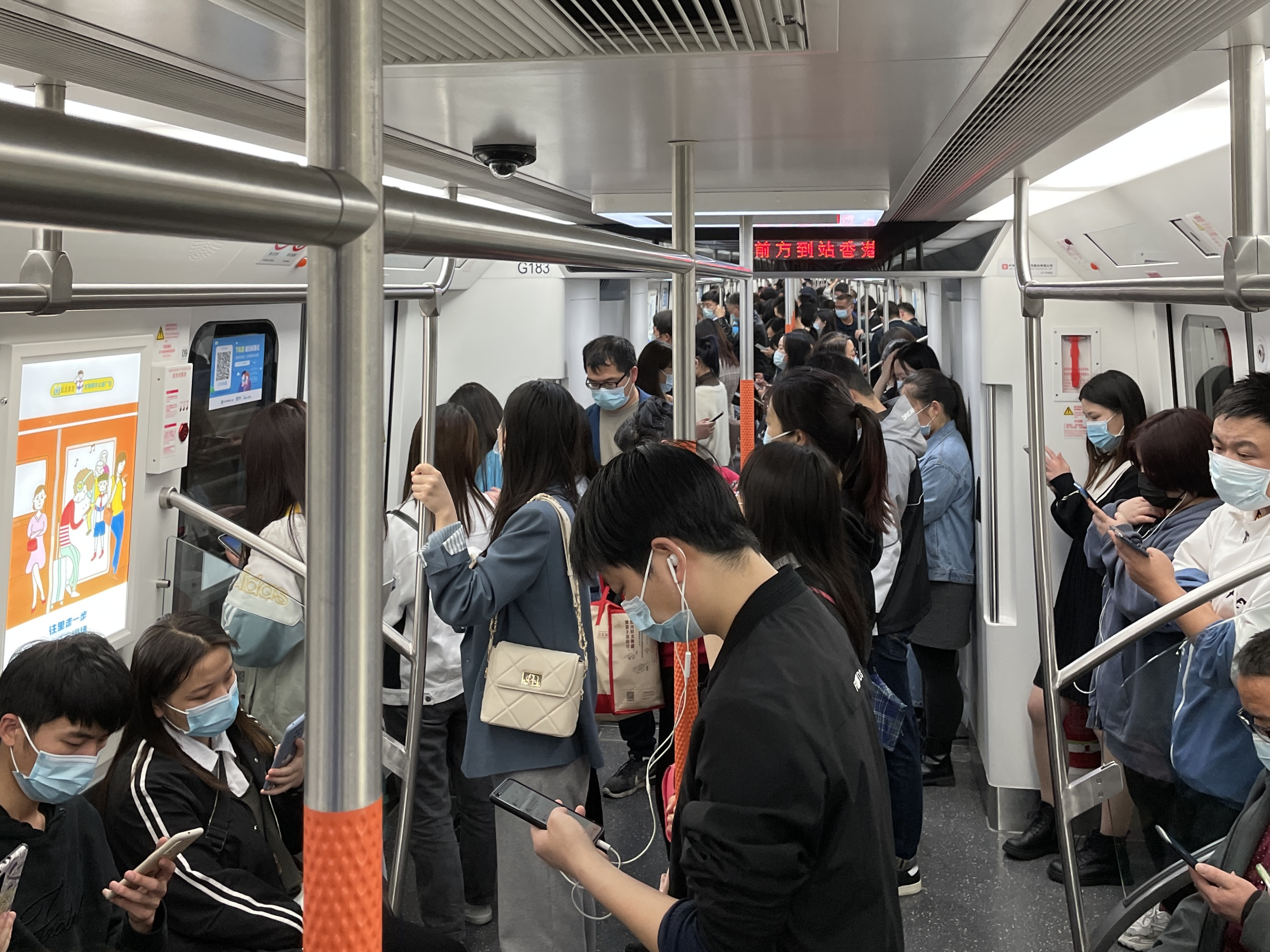
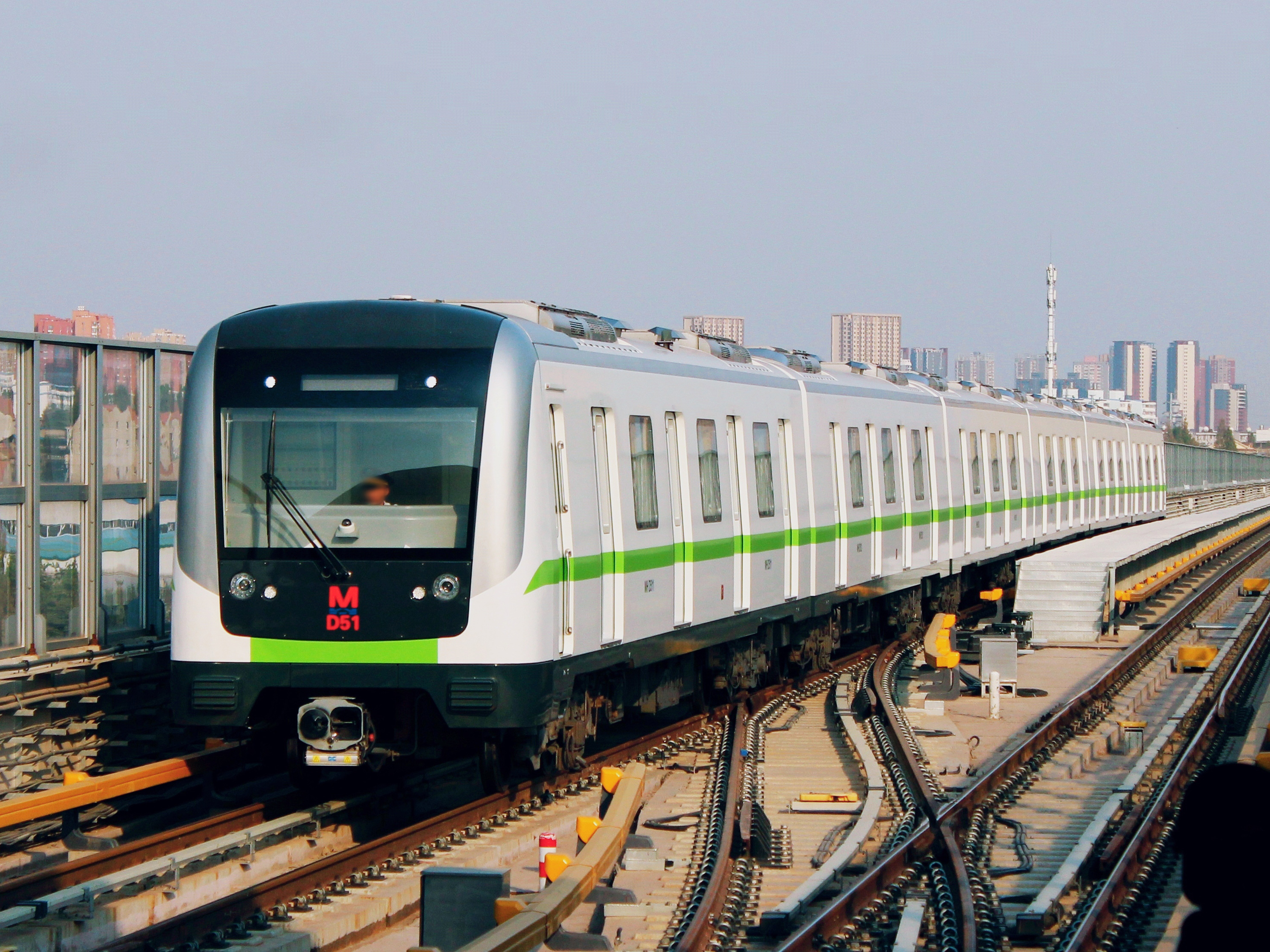
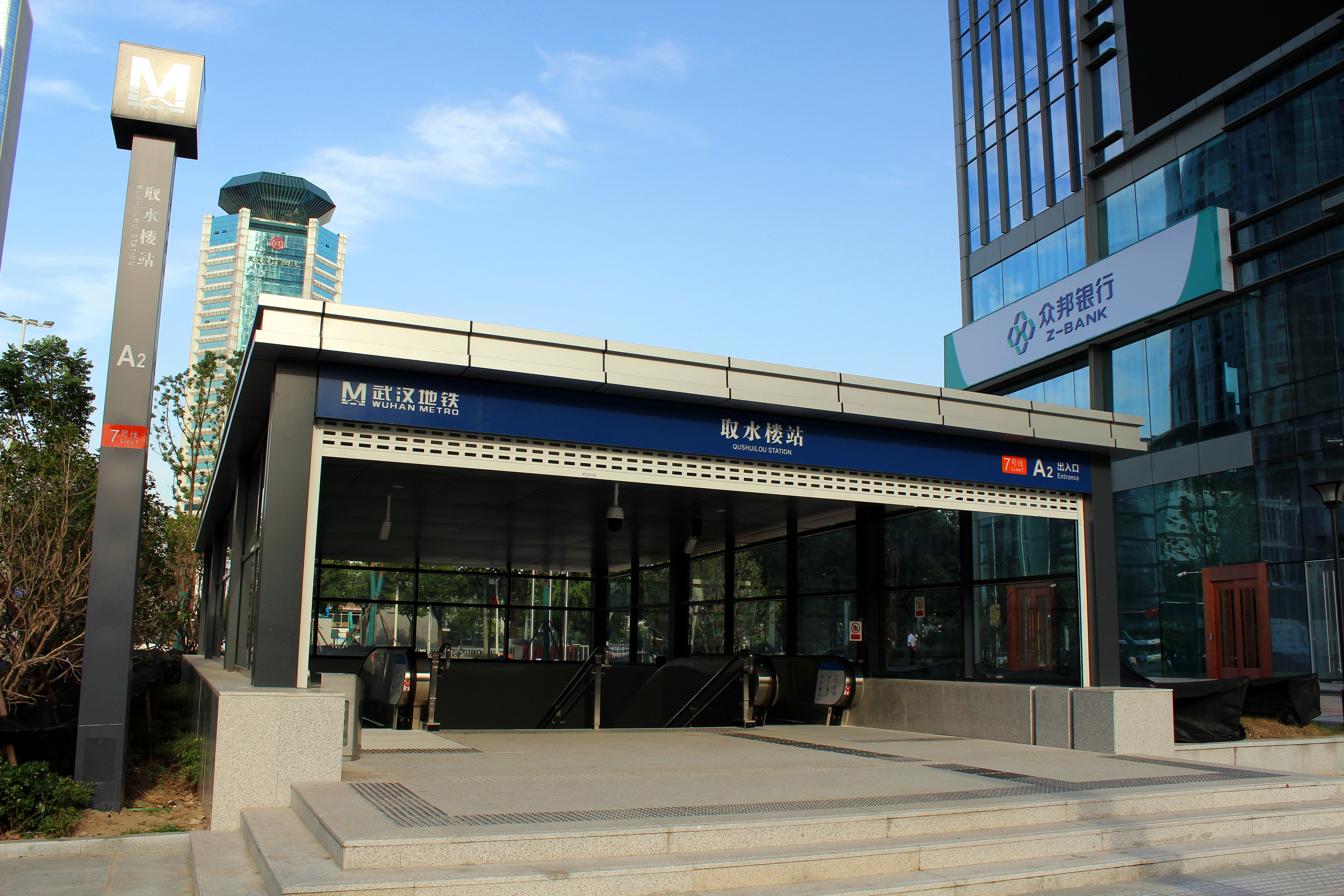
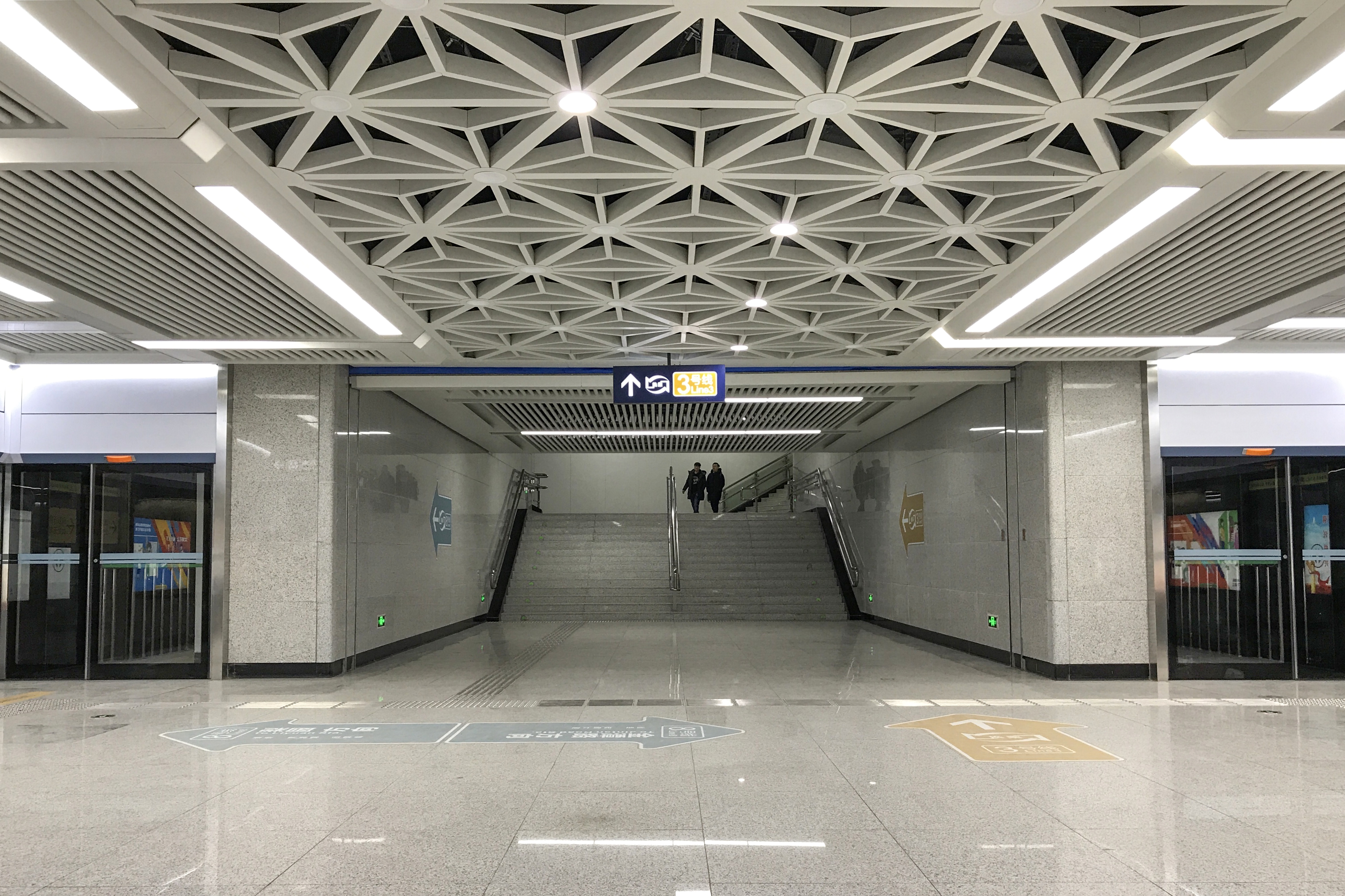
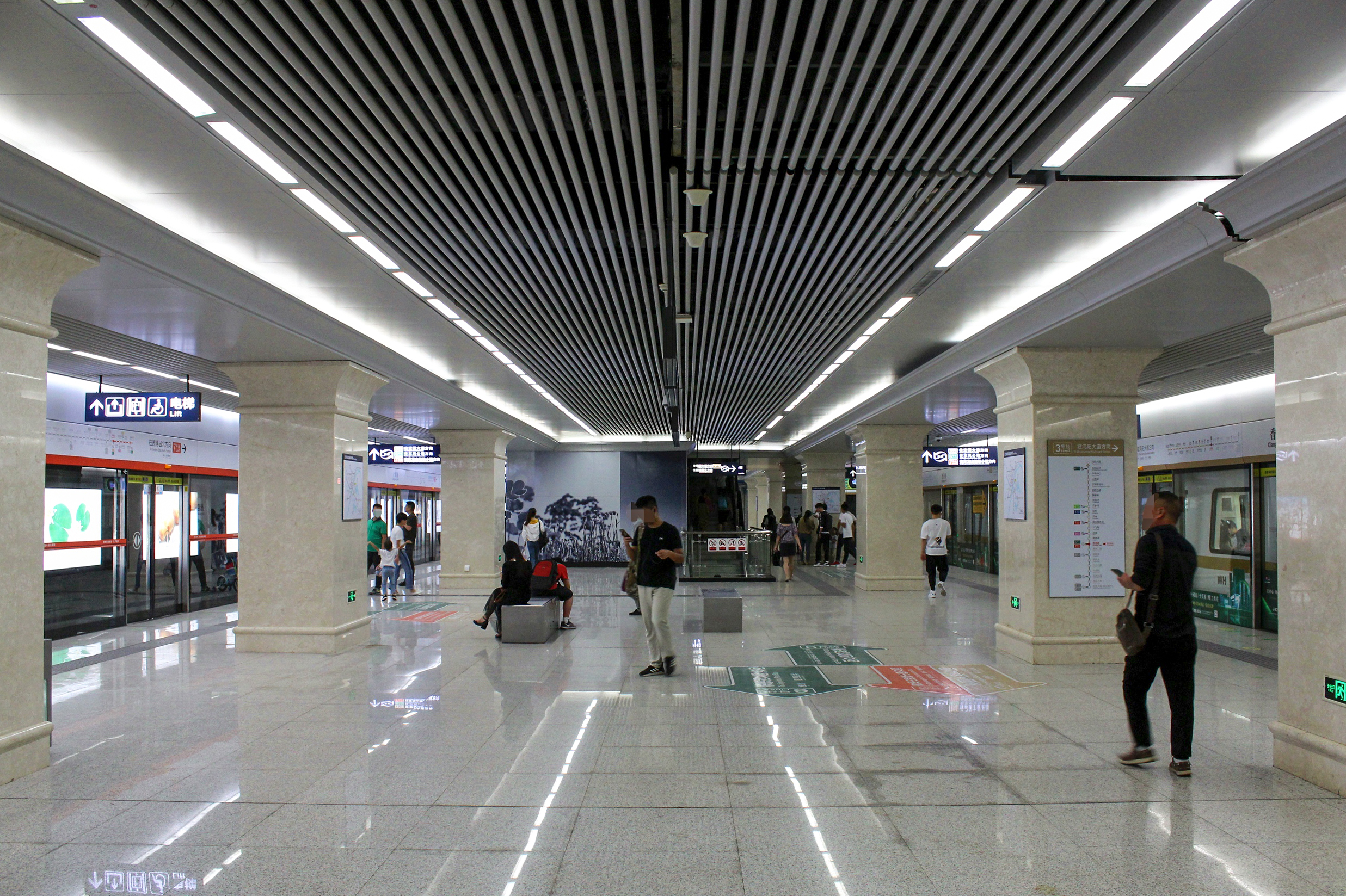

Overview
- Owner: Wuhan Metro Group Co., Ltd.
- Locale: Wuhan, Hubei, China
- Transit type: Rapid transit
- Number of lines: 13
- Number of stations: 351 (Note: Transfer stations are counted more than once.)
- Daily ridership: 4.02 million (2024); 6.022 million (Highest record on 31 December 2025)
- Annual ridership: 1.468 billion (2024)
- Website: www.wuhanrt.com

Operation
- Began operation: 28 July 2004; 22 years ago
- Operators: Wuhan Metro Group Co., Ltd.
- Character: Elevated and underground
- Train length: 4, 6 or 8 cars
- Headway: 2 1/2–9 min

Technical
- System length: 581 km (361.0 mi)
- Track gauge: 1,435 mm (4 ft 8 1/2 in) standard gauge
- Electrification: 1,500 V DC third rail or overhead catenary (Line 6, Line 12 and 19); 750 V DC third rail (Lines 1, 2, 3 and 4)
- Top speed: 80 km/h (50 mph); 100 km/h (62 mph) (Lines 7, 11 and Yangluo Line); 120 km/h (75 mph) (Line 16 and Line 19)
System map

Wuhan Metro
- Simplified Chinese: 武汉地铁
- Traditional Chinese: 武漢地鐵
Transcriptions
Standard Mandarin
- Hanyu Pinyin: Wǔhàn Dìtiě

Alternative Chinese name
- Simplified Chinese: 武汉轨道交通
- Traditional Chinese: 武漢軌道交通
Transcriptions
Standard Mandarin
- Hanyu Pinyin: Wǔhàn Guǐdào Jiāotōng

Wuhan Metro is a rapid transit system serving the city of Wuhan, Hubei, China. Owned and operated by Wuhan Metro Group Co., Ltd., the network now includes 13 lines, 351 stations, and 581 kilometres of track length as of October 29, 2026. With 1.35 billion annual passengers in 2023, Wuhan Metro is the sixth-busiest rapid transit system in mainland China. There are a number of lines or sections under construction.

Line 1, the first line in the system, opened on 28 July 2004, making Wuhan the seventh city in mainland China with a rapid transit system, after the cities of Beijing, Tianjin, Shanghai, Guangzhou, Changchun, and Dalian. Line 2 opened on 28 December 2012 and is the first underground rail line crossing the Yangtze River. The system has since undergone rapid expansion.

== History ==
Preliminary studies of urban rail transit systems were prompted by the city shortly after a Belgian Railways delegation visit in 1984. Following the demolition of the old Beijing-Hankou Railway, the city of Wuhan planned to utilize the corridor to construct the city's first rapid transit rail line. In September 1992, the Wuhan Metro Construction Group was established by Wuhan Municipal Construction Commission and a supervision group, led by the mayor Qian Yunlu, was subsequently formed in 1993 to facilitate the project's funding, planning, logistics, and organization. It took seven years before the city was able to fund construction.

In October 1999, the National Planning Commission (predecessor of the National Development and Reform Commission) approved the Wuhan "Light Rail" project (Line 1, phase 1), signalling the start of serious work on the rail transit project. On October 2, 2000, the Wuhan Municipal Government ratified the establishment of Wuhan Rail Transit Co., Ltd., and contracted construction, operation, administration and related real estate development to the corporation.

In December 2000, the National Planning Commission accepted a feasibility report on the project and approved construction on phase 1 of Line 1. On December 23, 2000, the project broke ground and comprehensive construction began.

In 2002, with the anticipation of an economic boom and increasing demand for urban rail transit, Wuhan Municipal Government approved the city's first long-term rail transit master plan. On July 28, 2004, the ten-station long "light rail" line was opened to the public and entered revenue service in August. However, low ridership discouraged the city from funding the extension project, for which ground had been broken on December 15, 2005, and a 4-year delay in construction ensued. In April 2006, the NDRC ratified a six-year construction/operation plan, but it was not until a year later on April 9, 2007, that NDRC accepted the feasibility report for line 1, phase 2 (the extension project) and approved construction on the project.

In the interim, construction began on Fanhu station of the fully underground Line 2 on November 16, 2006, as a response to the six-year plan adopted by NDRC earlier. Construction also began on the underground line 4 stations of Wuchang railway station in June, and Wuhan railway station in September, as parts of the integral capital project to revamp and construct the Wuhan Railway Hub.

In May 2007, the Hubei Provincial Development and Reform Commission (HDRC) approved preliminary designs on Line 1, phase 2, and comprehensive construction subsequently commenced in June. On May 15, the city government approved the establishment of Wuhan Metro Group Co., Ltd., which would replace the Wuhan Rail Transit Co., Ltd and assume its responsibilities and benefits.

On September 12, 2007, the NDRC accepted the feasibility report to Line 2, phase 1, and preliminary designs were approved by the HDRC in December 2007. However, it was not until September 2008 that land purchases and funding were facilitated and comprehensive construction began to take place. In October 2009, drilling of the Yangtze River tunnel started.

On March 13, 2009, the NDRC accepted a feasibility report to Line 4, phase 1. On May 13, 2009, the HDRC ratified preliminary designs on Line 4, phase 1. Comprehensive construction ensued on the Wuchang segment of Line 4. A more ambitious urban rapid transit plan was submitted for NDRC review in October 2009, and in late November, on-site panel investigations were conducted by China International Engineering Consulting Corporation.

In February 2010, Wuhan Metro's first commercial property was topped out in Hanxi 1st Road station. On July 29, Line 1 phase 2 entered revenue service from Dijiao to Dongwu Boulevard. Despite plans to extend the westernmost terminus to Jinshan Avenue in Dongxihu District, the station was never built. A short stub with crossover tracks was constructed behind Dongwu Boulevard. Zhuyehai, a station in Qiaokou District, remained non-operational in spite of the existence of complete platforms. Neither exits nor staircases had been built yet. It was due to open when the Wuhan IKEA store was completed in late 2014.

A revised and more detailed construction plan was accepted by the NDRC on January 31, 2011. The plan specified the city's plan to complete construction on Line 3, 4, 6, 7, and 8 before 2017. Beginning on March 1, Line 1 subdivided its fare zones from 3 to 5 and lowered maximum fare per ride from 5 CNY to 4 CNY. Wuhan Tong cardholders will receive a 20 percent discount on single ride fares. On April 9, Line 1 welcomed its 100,000,000th customer, who was awarded a one-year pass to the Metro. On September 9, preliminary designs on Line 4, phase 2 (Hanyang segment) was approved by HDRC.

On February 17, 2012, the NDRC accepted a feasibility report on Line 3, phase 1, the fourth line in Wuhan Metro's grid and the first to cross the Han River, connecting the boroughs of Hankou and Hanyang. A feasibility report to Line 6—the second Hankou-Hanyang connection—was also approved by the NDRC on December 21, 2012. Seven days later, Line 2 entered revenue service, connecting some of the most populated areas of Hankou, Wuchang, and the Optics Valley.

On April 12, 2013, the NDRC granted acceptance to a feasibility report of Line 8, phase 1, which connects Hankou and Wuchang via the Second Yangtze River Bridge corridor. Construction began in June 2013 and was completed in December 2017.

On 23 January 2020, the entire metro network was shut down, along with all other public transport in the city, including national railway and air travel, in an effort to control the spread of the COVID-19 pandemic in Hubei.

On 28 March 2020, six lines (Line 1, 2, 3, 4, 6, 7) resumed operations, after a two-month lockdown. On 8 April 2020, Line 8 Phase 1 resumed operations. On 22 April 2020, Line 8 Phase 3, Line 11, Yangluo line resumed operations.

== Lines ==
Wuhan Metro Map

Line	Termini (District)		Opened	Last extension	Length	Stations	Layout
1	Jinghe (Dongxihu)	Hankou North (Huangpi)	July 28, 2004	December 26, 2017	37.936 km (23.572 mi)	32	Elevated
2	Tianhe International Airport (Huangpi)	Fozuling (Jiangxia)	December 28, 2012	February 19, 2019	60.304 km (37.471 mi)	38	Elevated & underground
3	Zhuanyang Boulevard (Hannan)	Hongtu Boulevard (Jiang'an)	December 28, 2015	-	29.660 km (18.430 mi)	24	Underground
4	Bailin (Caidian)	Wuhan Railway Station (Hongshan)	December 28, 2013	September 25, 2019	49.693 km (30.878 mi)	37	Elevated & underground
5	Hongxia (Hongshan)	East Square of Wuhan Railway Station (Hongshan)	December 26, 2021	December 1, 2023	37.216 km (23.125 mi)	27	Elevated & underground
6	Xincheng 11th Road (Dongxihu)	Dongfeng Motor Corporation (Caidian)	December 28, 2016	December 26, 2021	42.537 km (26.431 mi)	32	Underground
7	Huangpi Square (Huangpi)	Qinglongshan Ditiexiaozhen (Jiangxia)	October 1, 2018	October 1, 2024	83.012 km (51.581 mi)	36	Elevated & underground
8	Jintan Road (Dongxihu)	Military Athletes' Village (Jiangxia)	December 26, 2017	January 2, 2021	38.197 km (23.735 mi)	26	Underground
11	Jiang'an Road (Wuchang)	Gediannan Railway Station (Huarong)	October 1, 2018	December 27, 2024	39.363 km (24.459 mi)	23	Underground
12	Loop line		May 1, 2026	October 29, 2026	59.9 km (37.2 mi)	37	Underground
16	South International Expo Center (Hanyang)	Hannan General Airport (Hannan)	December 26, 2021	December 30, 2022	36.458 km (22.654 mi)	14	Elevated & underground
19	West Square of Wuhan Railway Station (Hongshan)	Xinyuexi Park (Hongshan)	December 30, 2023	-	22.686 km (14.096 mi)	7	Underground
Yangluo	Zhongyi Road (Jiang'an)	Jintai (Xinzhou)	December 26, 2017	October 29, 2026	38.12 km (23.69 mi)	18	Elevated & underground
Total					581 km (361 mi)	351 (Note: Transfer stations are counted repeatedly.)	

=== Line 1 ===
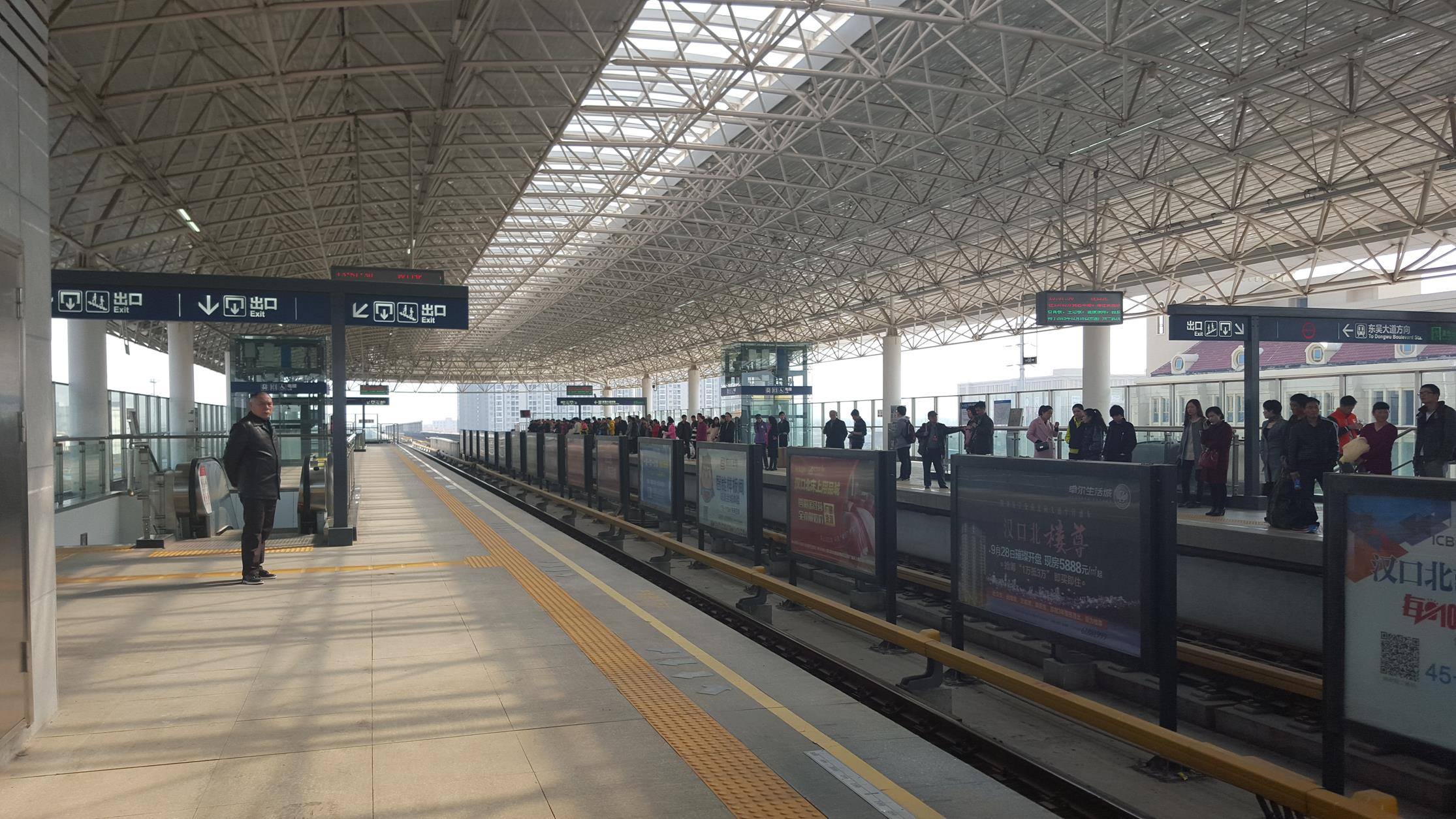
Hankou North station of Line 1

Line 1 is a 37.788 km (23.480 mi) elevated urban rail line entirely located in the borough of Hankou. It runs a northwest–southeast route that approximately parallels with Jiefang Avenue for its entire length. There are 27 planned stations, among which 25 are operational. Line 1 operates 33 four-car train sets, 12 of which are manufactured by Changchun Railway Vehicles, and 21 by Zhuzhou Electric Locomotive Co., Ltd.

On July 28, 2004, the first phase of Line 1 began service from Huangpu Road to Zongguan. On July 28, 2010, Line 1 extended from both ends after the completion of phase 2. The phase 3 expansion, which extends the northeast terminus to Hankou North Station, entered revenue service on May 28, 2014. The phase 4 expansion, which extends to Jinghe Station from Dongwu Boulevard. The phase 4 opened on December 26, 2017. Line 1's color is dark blue.

=== Line 2 ===
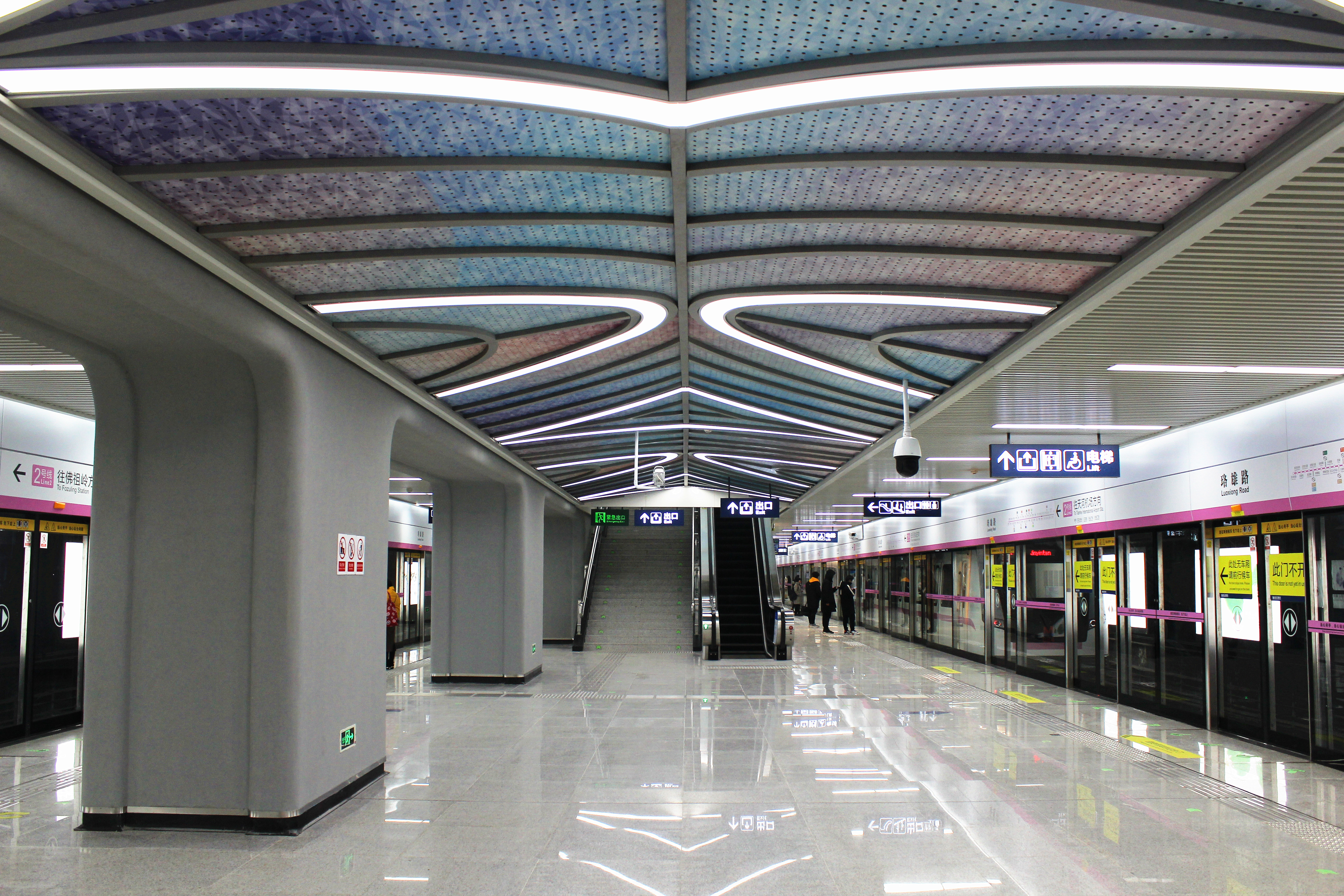
Luoxiong Road station of Line 2

Line 2 is a 27.895 km (17.333 mi) underground subway connecting the boroughs of Hankou and Wuchang. Upon completion, Line 2 was the first subway in China to cross the mighty Yangtze River. It runs in a northwest–southeast route and crosses the Yangtze River near Jianghan Road, and Jiyuqiao in Wuchang. Tunnel drilling concluded on February 26, 2012. Revenue service of Line 2 began on December 28, 2012. Line 2 operates 41 six-car train sets, all of which were manufactured by Zhuzhou Electric Locomotive Co., Ltd.

Line 2 is mostly underground, except for Songjiagang and Hangkongzhongbu stations. It was extended towards both directions. The southern extension brought the southeast terminus from Optics Valley Square to Fozuling, and the northwest extension plan brought the northwest terminus from Jinyintan to Tianhe International Airport, providing convenient access for airport and residential areas en route. Early on, construction work on both extensions was expected to commence in 2013, and the tentative completion dates was set at 2015. In May 2014, it was reported that the construction work on the southern extension would start within 2014, with construction completed by February 19, 2019.

Nowadays, Line 2 only have 6 cars, but in the future, it is possible to add 2 more cars to carry more people during rush hours when 6 cars are not enough. Line 2's color is pink.

=== Line 3 ===
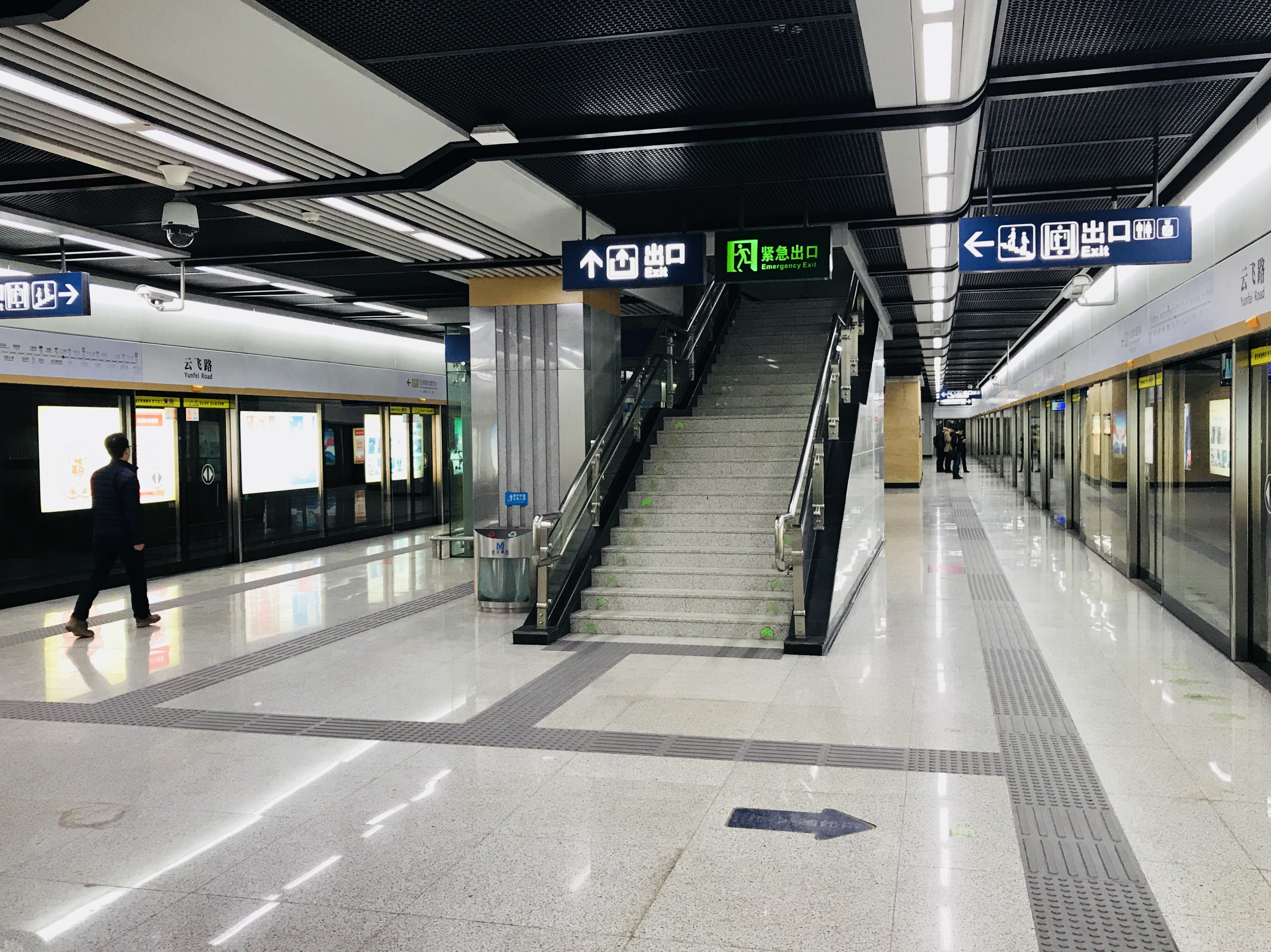
Yunfei Road station of Line 3

Overall construction of Line 3 was approved by National Development and Reform Commission on February 23, 2012, and officially started on March 31, 2012. Line 3 went into operation on December 28, 2015. Line 3 cars are Type B and manufactured by CRRC Changchun Railway Vehicles. Line 3's color is dark yellow.

=== Line 4 ===
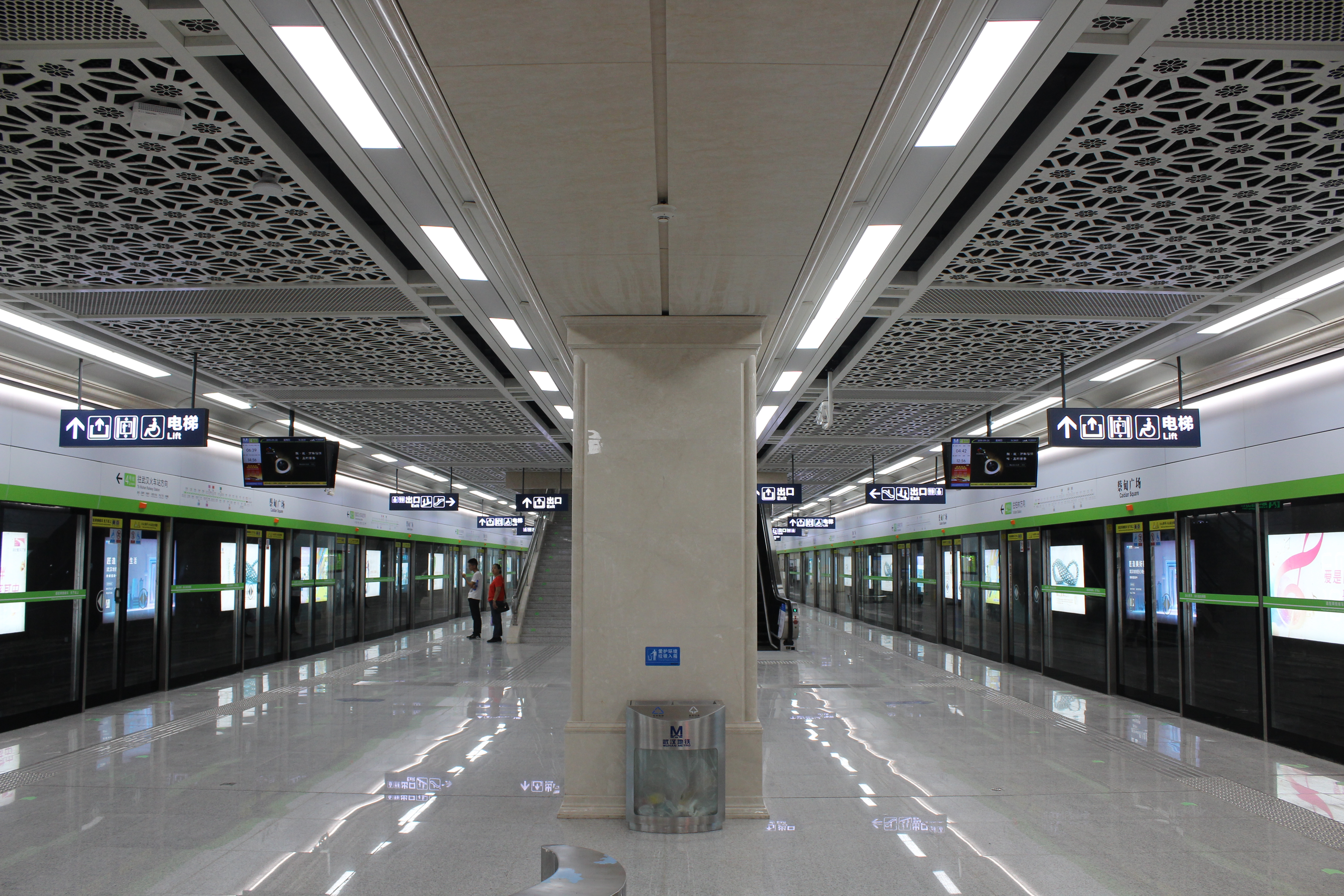
Caidian Square station of Line 4

Line 4 is mostly underground. It will run in an east–west route serving the Hanyang and Wuchang distincts. The first phase linking Wuchang and Wuhan railway stations opened on December 28, 2013; since that day, all three main railway stations of Wuhan are connected by the Metro. The second phase of Line 4 will crossing the Yangtze River to Hanyang opened in 2014. Line 4 cars are Type B and manufactured by CRRC Zhuzhou Electric Locomotive. Line 4's color is light green.

=== Line 5 ===
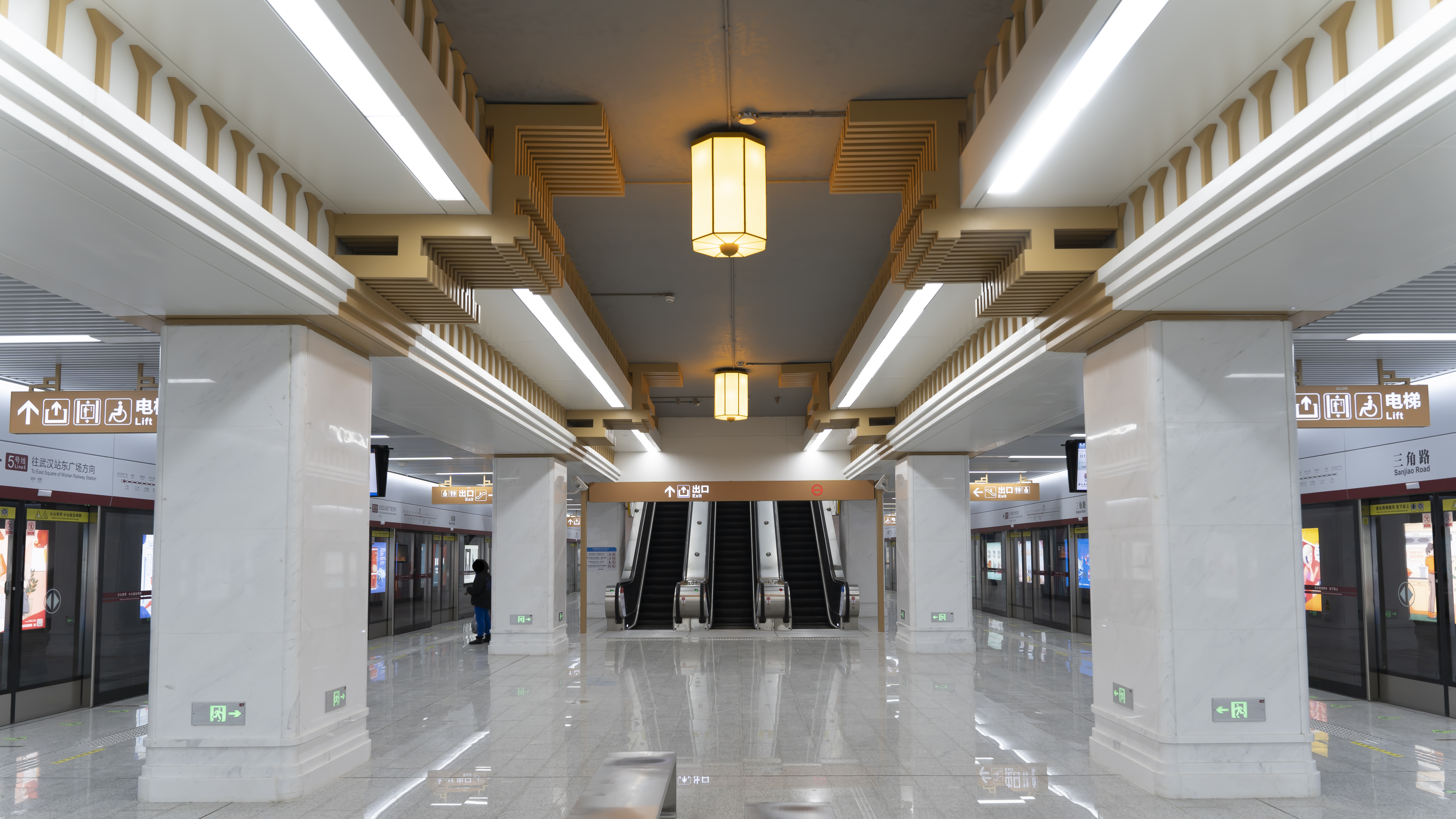
Sanjiao Street station of Line 5

Line 5 started operation on 26 December 2021. Line 5's color is coral.

=== Line 6 ===
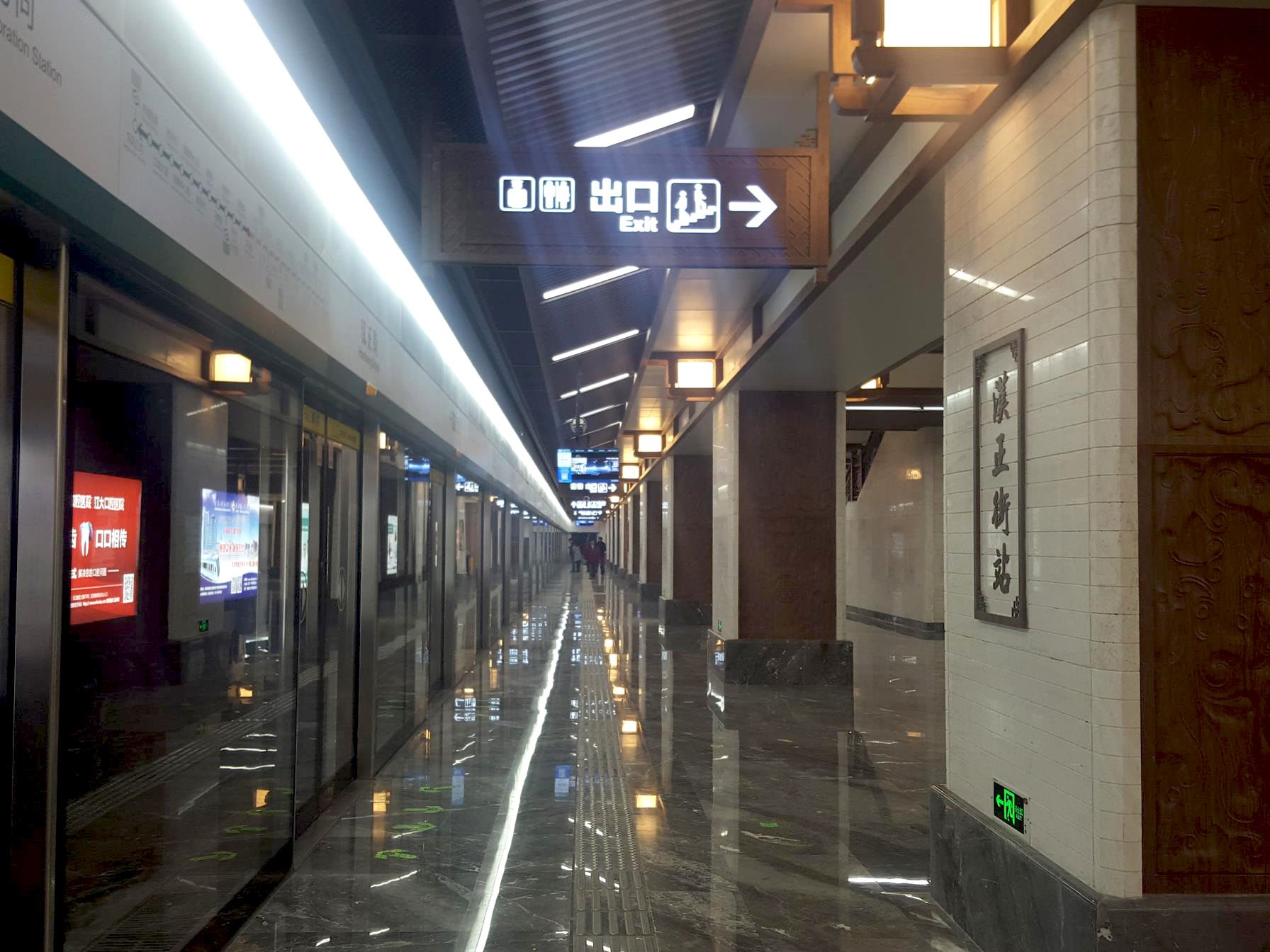
Hanzheng Street station of Line 6

Line 6 opened in 2016.

And it is the first line of Wuhan Metro to use high capacity A size trains with overhead lines.. Line 6 uses Type A cars manufactured by CRRC Zhuzhou Electric Locomotive. Line 6's color is green.

=== Line 7 ===
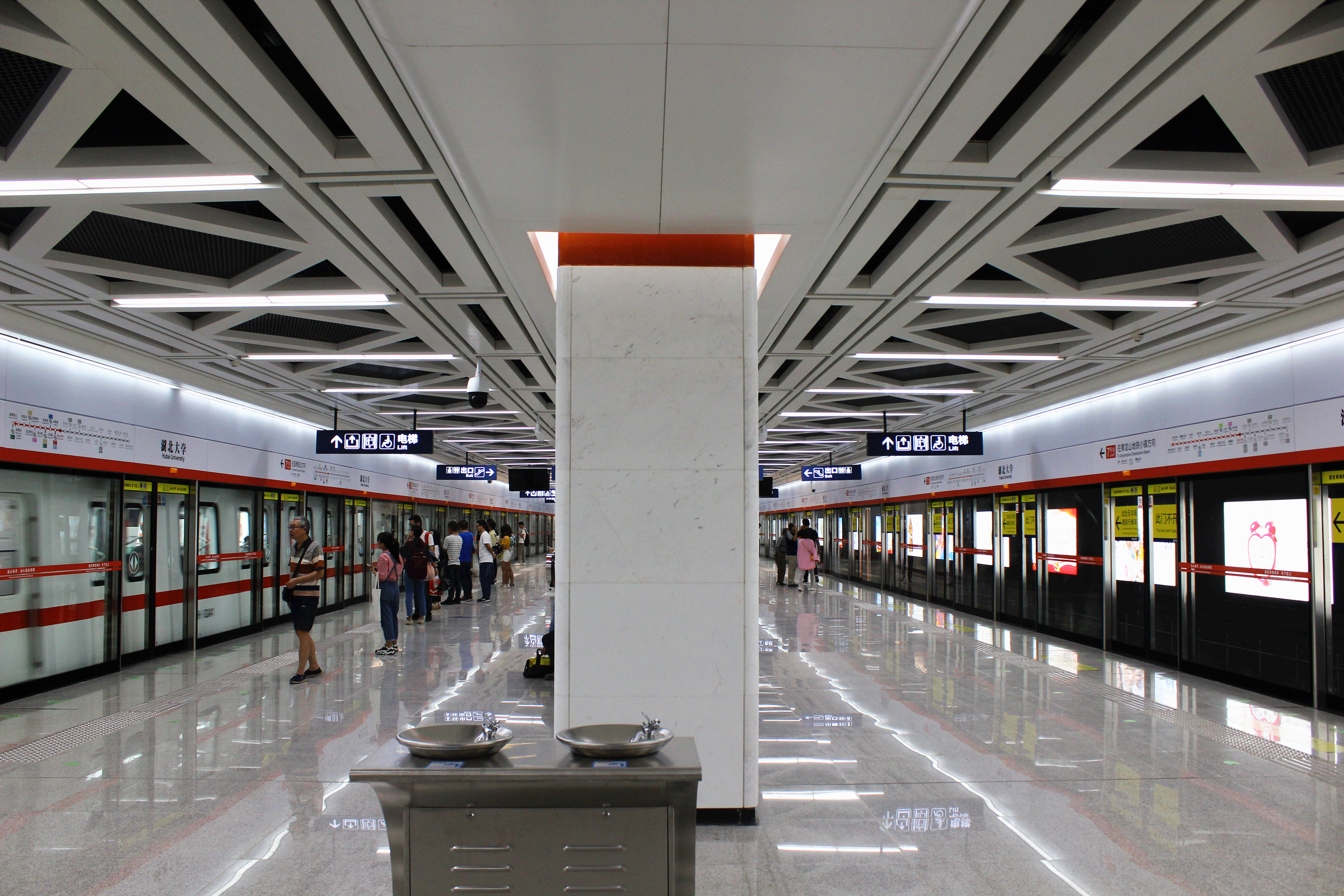
Hubei University station of Line 7

Line 7 is a rapid transit line in Wuhan. The line runs from Huangpi Square in Huangpi District to Qinglongshan Ditiexiaozhen in Jiangxia District. It serves residential & business areas such as Nanhu, Wuhan CBD and Wuhan Financial street. Line 7 reserves Wuhan Metro's highest capacity rolling stock to date featuring 8 Type-A car train sets accommodating 2480 people, compared to the standard 6 cars found on other lines. It is also the fastest urban line in the system, with trains capable of reaching the speed of 100 km/h (62 mph) compared to 80 km/h (50 mph) on other lines. Line 7's color is orange.

=== Line 8 ===
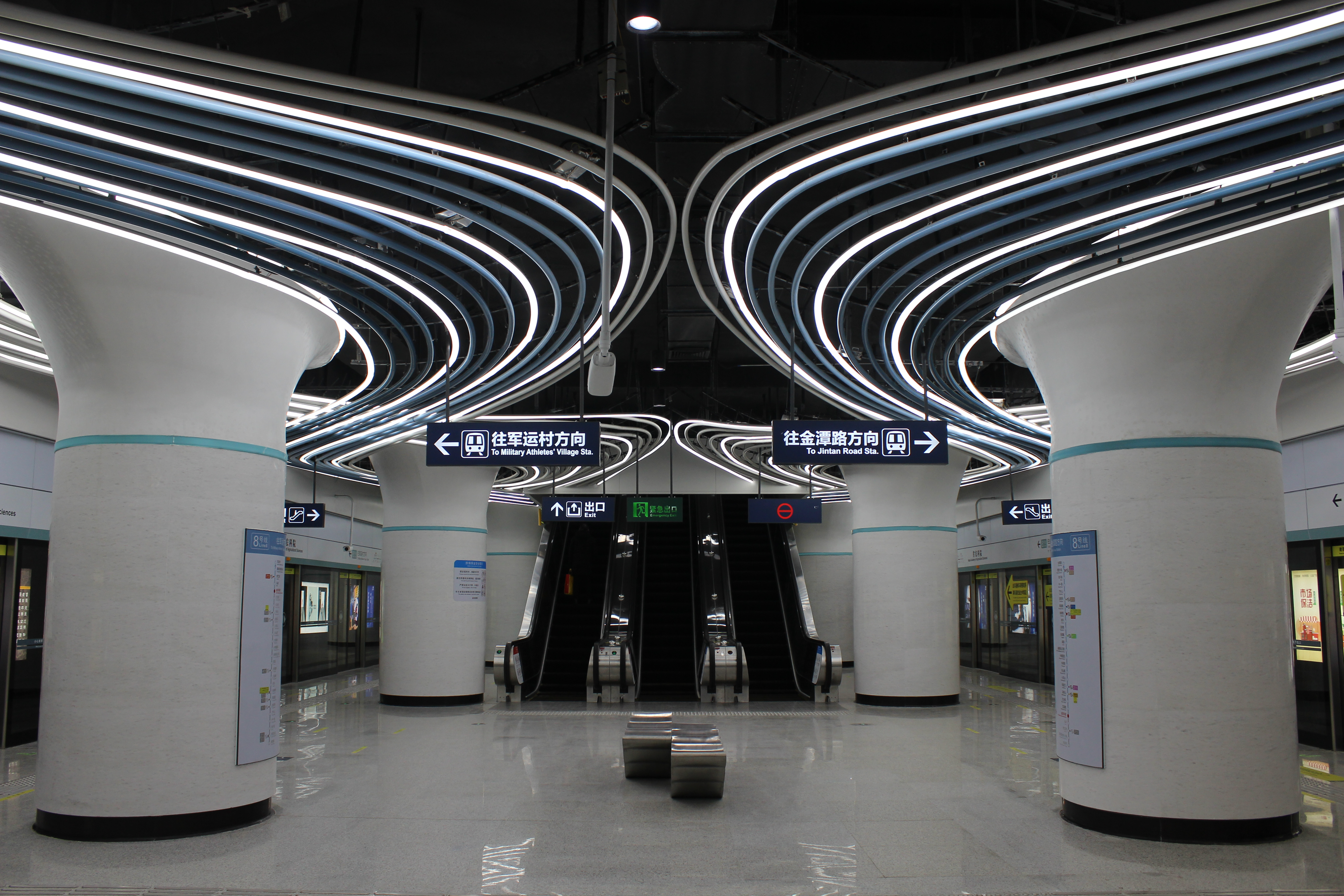
Hubei Academy of Agricultural Sciences station of Line 8

Line 8 currently consists of two separate parts. Line 8 Phase 1 was opened in 2017, and Line 8 Phase 3 was opened in 2019. Presently there are 12 stations on the Phase 1 section and 3 on the Phase 3 section. The Phase 2 that is connecting the two parts in 2021. Line 8's color is grey.

=== Line 11 ===
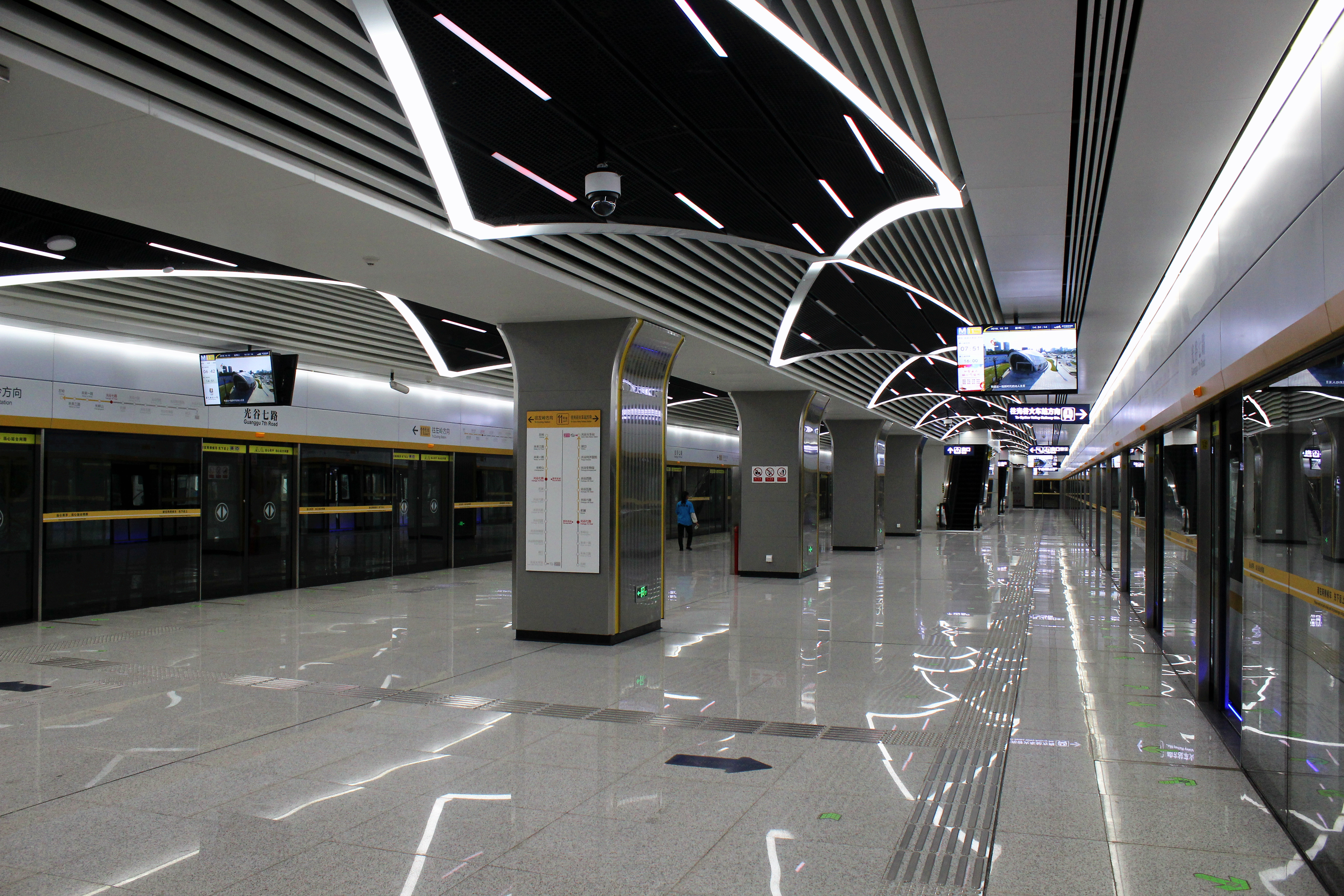
Guanggu 7th Road station of Line 11

Line 11 Phase 1 from Wuhandong railway station to Gediannan Railway station was opened on 1 October 2018, and Line 11 Phase 2 and 3 from Wuhandong railway station to Jiang'an Road station opened on 27 December 2024. Line 11 uses Type A cars manufactured by CRRC Changchun Railway Vehicles. Line 11's color is yellow.

=== Line 12 ===
Line 12 is a loop line. The first phase from Moshuihu Park to Gangduhuayuan opened on 1 May 2026. The second phase opened on 29 October 2026, completing the rest of the loop. At a length of 59.9 km, it is also the longest loop line in the world. (Note: Line 11 of Moscow Metro is 57.5 km in length after its branch closed in June 2024. The Line 11 branch has since reopened as part of Line 17 of Moscow Metro.) Line 12's color is blue.

=== Line 16 ===
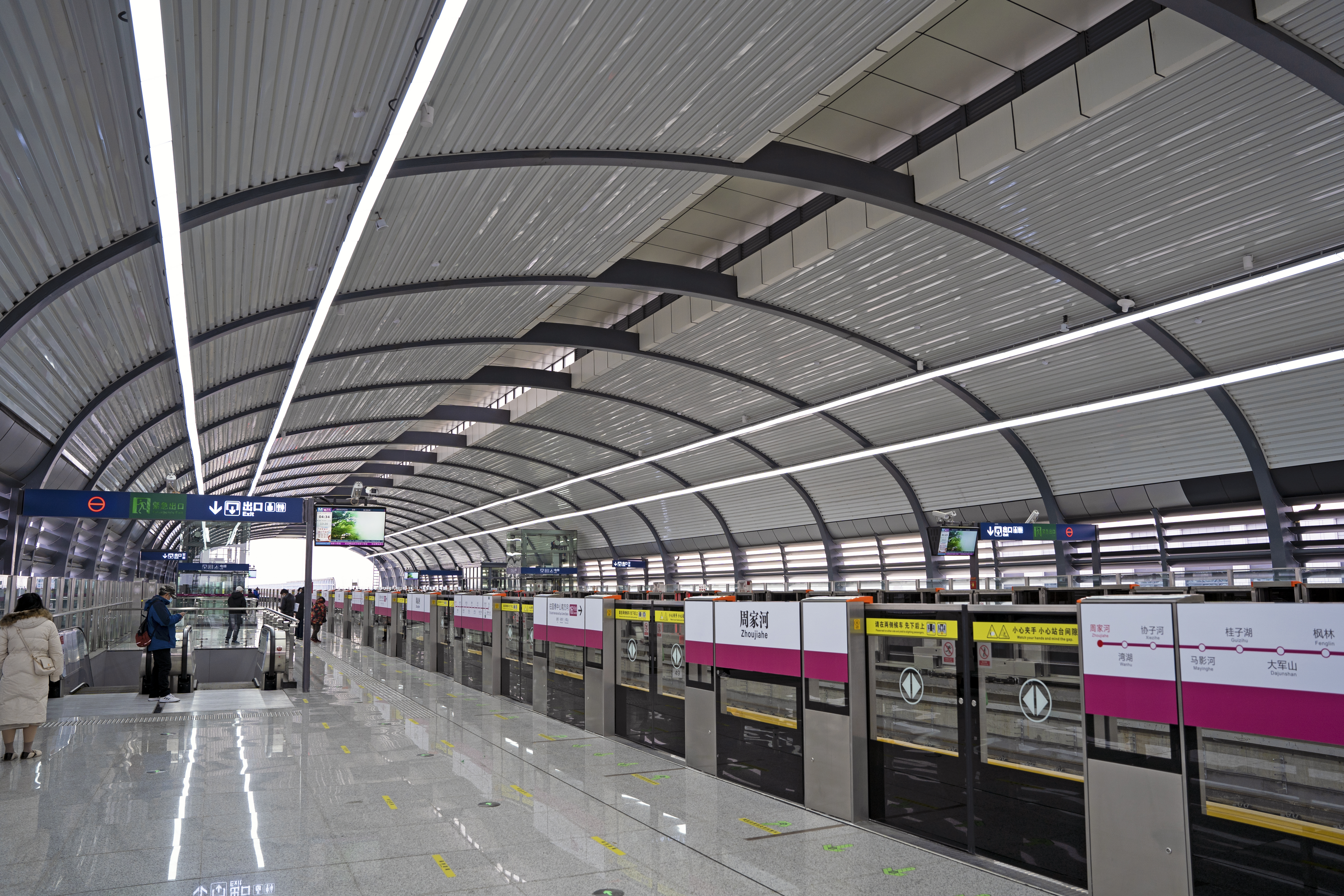
Zhoujiahe station of Line 16

Line 16 has a maximum speed of 120 kilometres per hour (75 mph) and has seven underground stations and five elevated stations. The line started operation on 26 December 2021. Line 16's color is fuchsia.

=== Line 19 ===
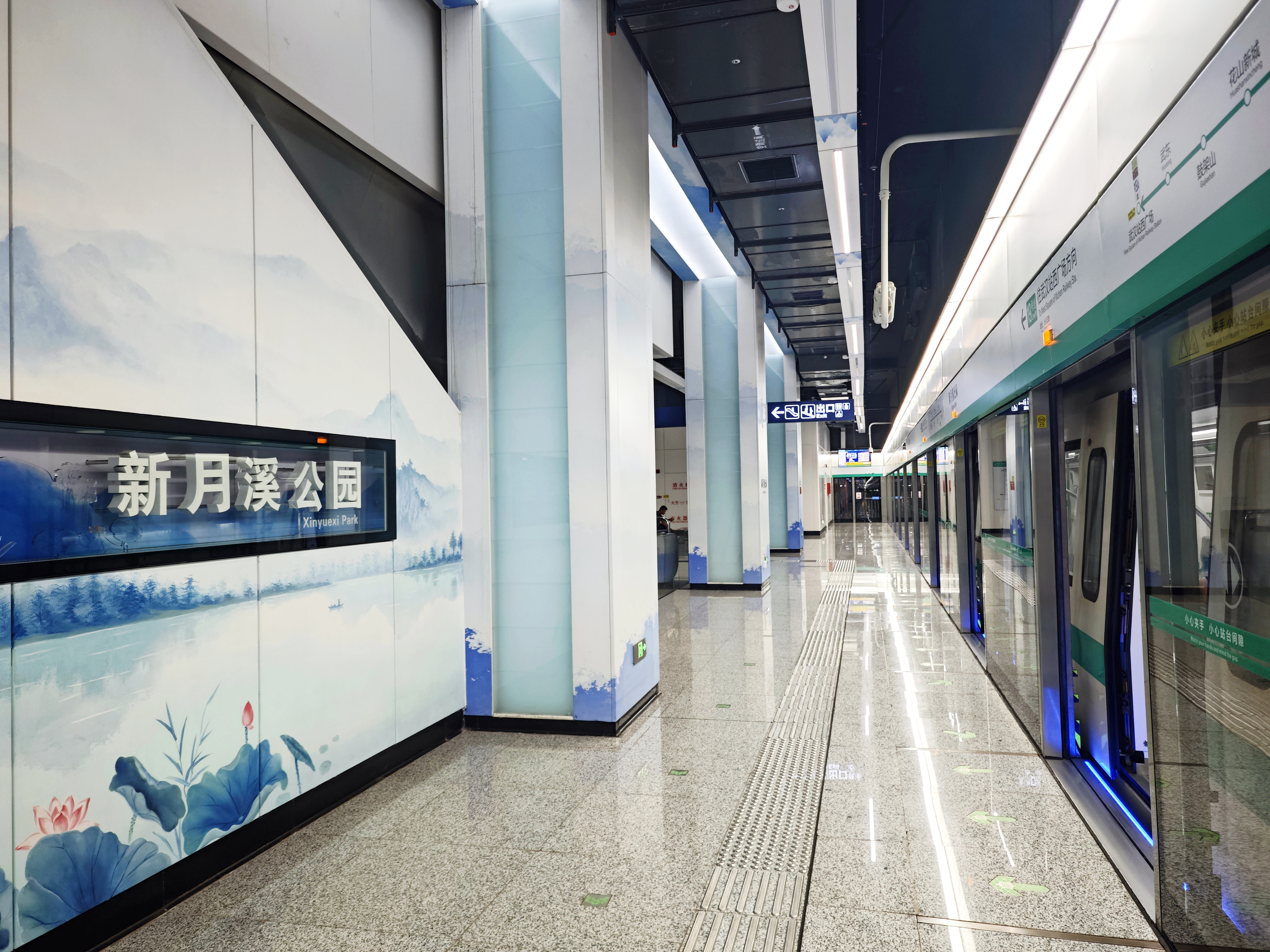
Xinyuexi Park station of Line 19

Line 19 is 23.3 kilometres (14.5 mi) long with seven stations, running between West Square of Wuhan Railway Station and Xinyuexi Park stations. With an operating speed of 120 kilometres per hour (75 mph) and plans to increase the speed to 140 kilometres per hour (87 mph), trains on line 19 run at the highest speed within the Wuhan Metro network. The line started operation on 30 December 2023. Line 19's color is sea green.

=== Yangluo Line (Line 21) ===
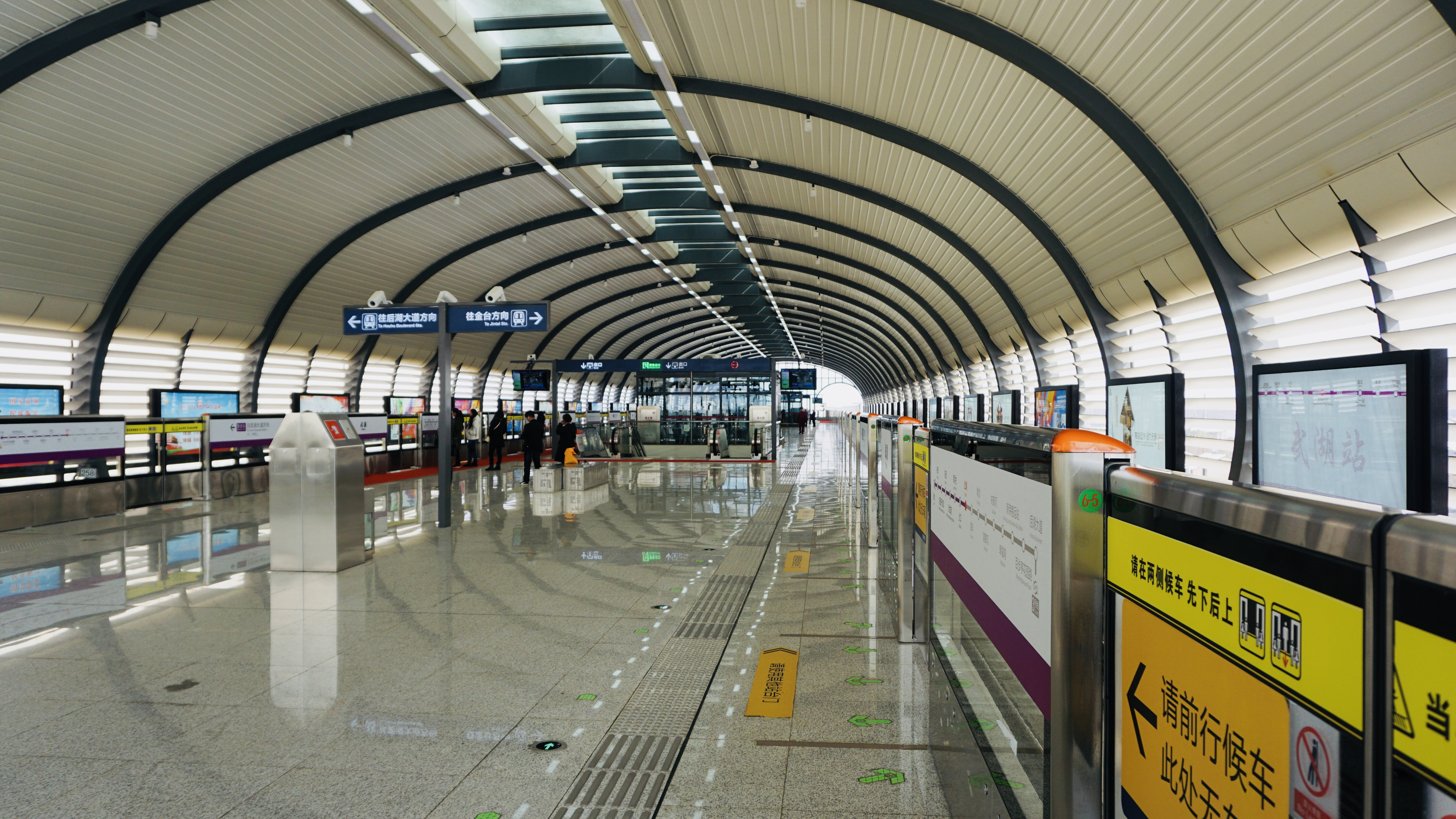
Wuhu station of Yangluo Line

The Yangluo Line is a suburban line. The line runs from Zhongyi Road to Jintai, a total distance of 38.12 km (23.69 mi). The line connects the urban area of Hankou and Yangluo, Xinzhou District. Yangluo Line's color is magenta.

== Services ==
=== Service routes ===
Short turns are used on Line 2, Line 4, and Line 7, while the other lines only operate the full length of the route. As far as Line 2, Line 4, and Line 7 are concerned, the short turns alternate with the full routes.

- Line 2
  - Short turn: Jinyintan — Wuhandong Railway Station
  - Full route: Tianhe International Airport — Fozuling
- Line 4
  - Short turn: Yulong Road — Wuhan Railway Station
  - Full route: Bailin — Wuhan Railway Station
- Line 7
  - Short turn: Julong Blvd — Banqiao
  - Full route: Huangpi square — Qinglongshan Ditiexiaozhen

=== Opening hours ===
The operating hours start at 6:00 on weekdays and 6:30 on weekends & holidays. The last trains of Line 16, Line 19 and Yangluo Line depart from the origin stations at 22:00 or 22:30, while other lines at 23:00. See the table below for more details.

Lines		Operating hours on weekdays	Operating hours on weekends or holidays
Line 1, 2, 3, 4, 5, 6, 7, 8, 11		6:00 — 23:00	6:30 — 23:00
Line 16	To Hannan General Airport	6:00 — 22:30	6:30 — 22:30
Line 16	To South International Expo Center	6:00 — 22:00	6:30 — 22:00
Line 19	To Xinyuexi Park	6:00 — 22:30	6:30 — 22:30
Line 19	To West Square of Wuhan Railway Station	6:00 — 22:00	6:30 — 22:00
Yangluo Line	To Jintai	6:00 — 22:30	6:30 — 22:30
Yangluo Line	To Houhu Boulevard	6:00 — 22:00	6:30 — 22:00

=== Ticketing ===
Fares vary based on the distance travelled. The specific charging standards are as follows:

¥2
0~4km
¥3
4~8km
¥4
8~12km
¥5
12~18km
¥6
18~24km
¥7
24~32km
¥8
32~40km
¥9
40~50km
+¥1
~+20km

Beyond 50 km, passengers can travel an additional 20 km for every additional ¥1.

The single-journey tokens, the multi-day passes, the contactless Wuhantong cards, the China T-union cards and the UnionPay cards are accepted. In addition, Wuhan metro introduced the mobile payment. The travelers can open the Alipay APP on the mobile phones, click on "Transport", and select "Wuhan". After completing identity verification, the travelers will obtain a QR code for the metro pass to enter and exit the metro faregates by having the QR code scanned.

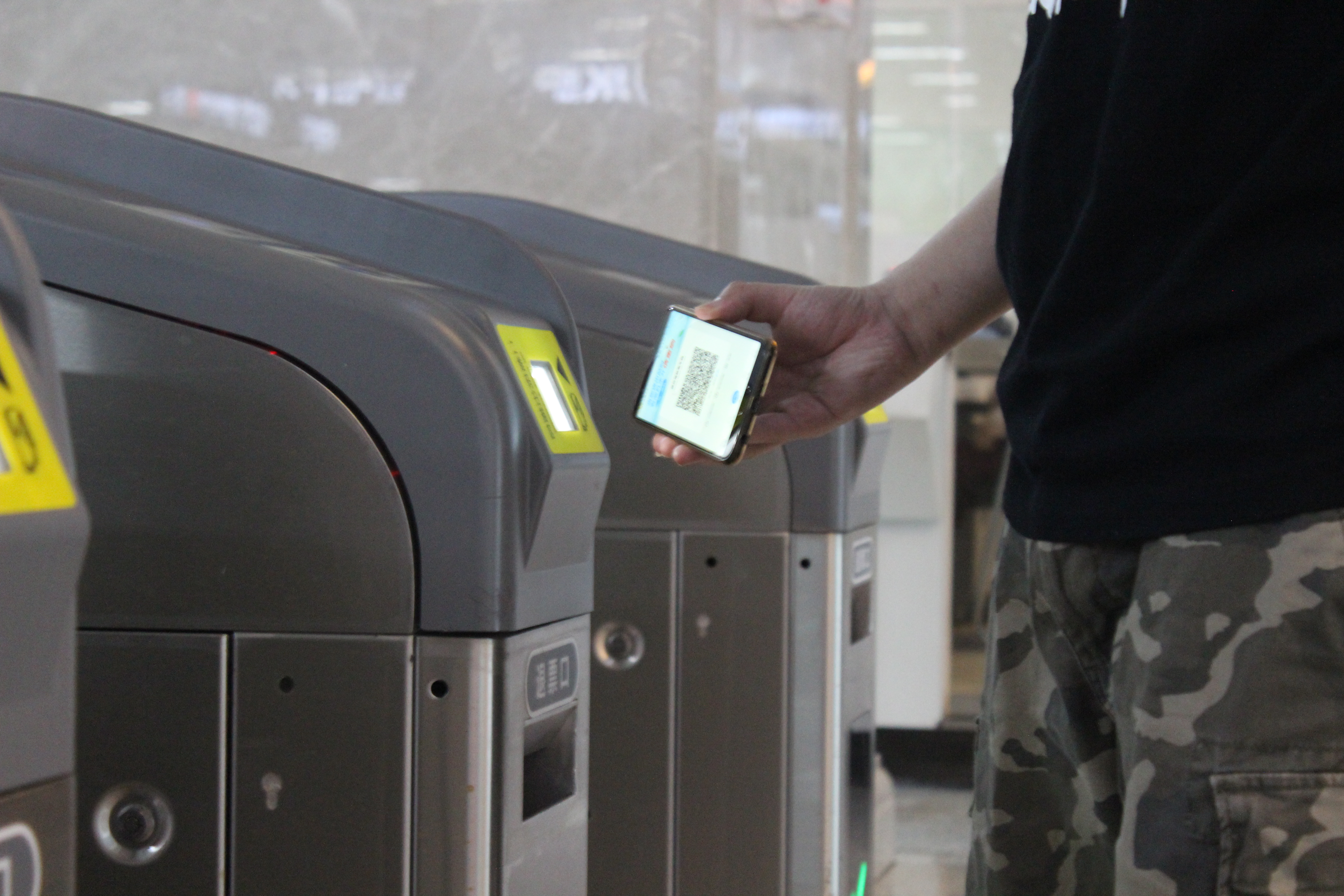
Wuhan Metro introduced QR code payment across the whole network.

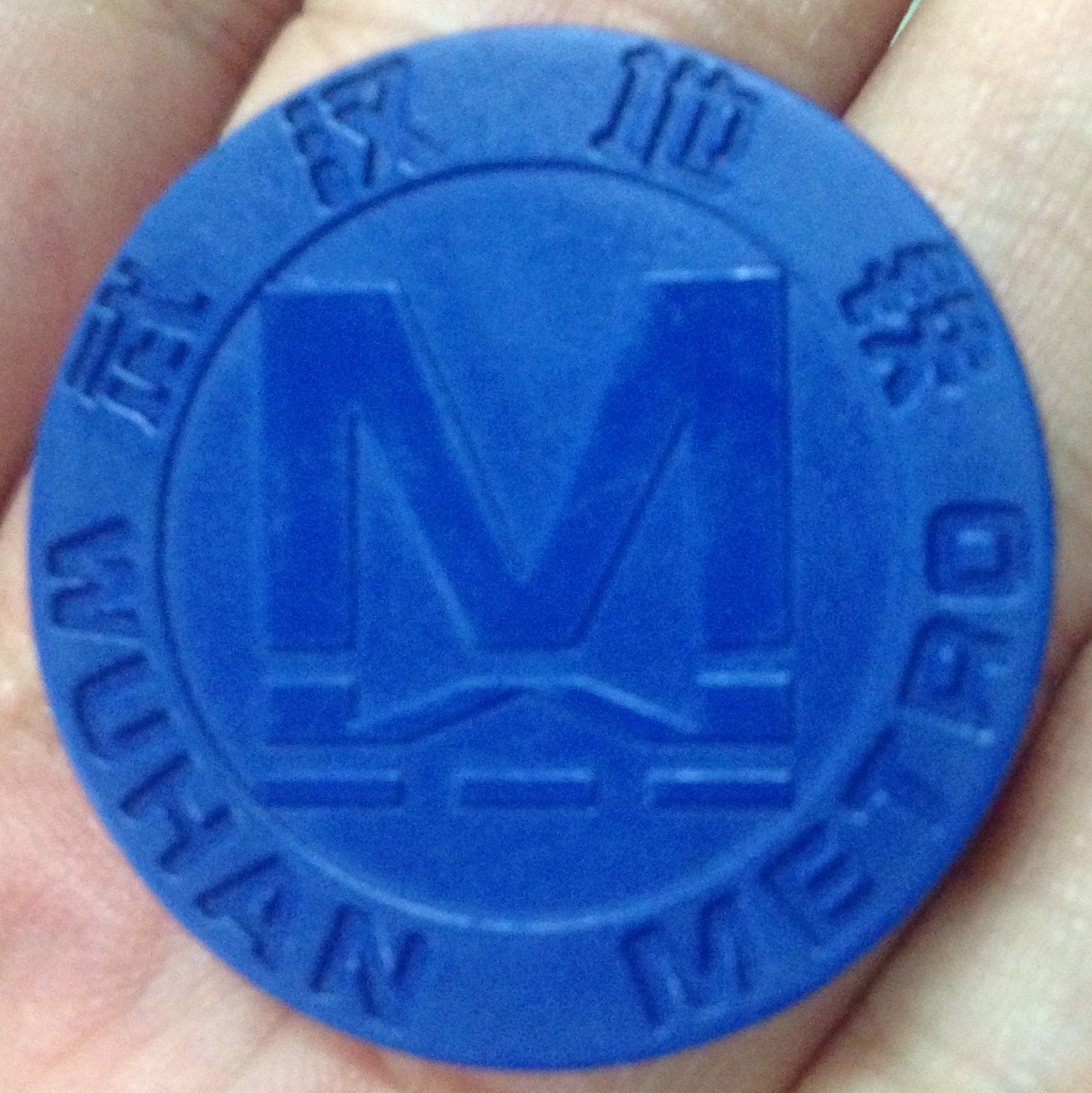
Single journey token

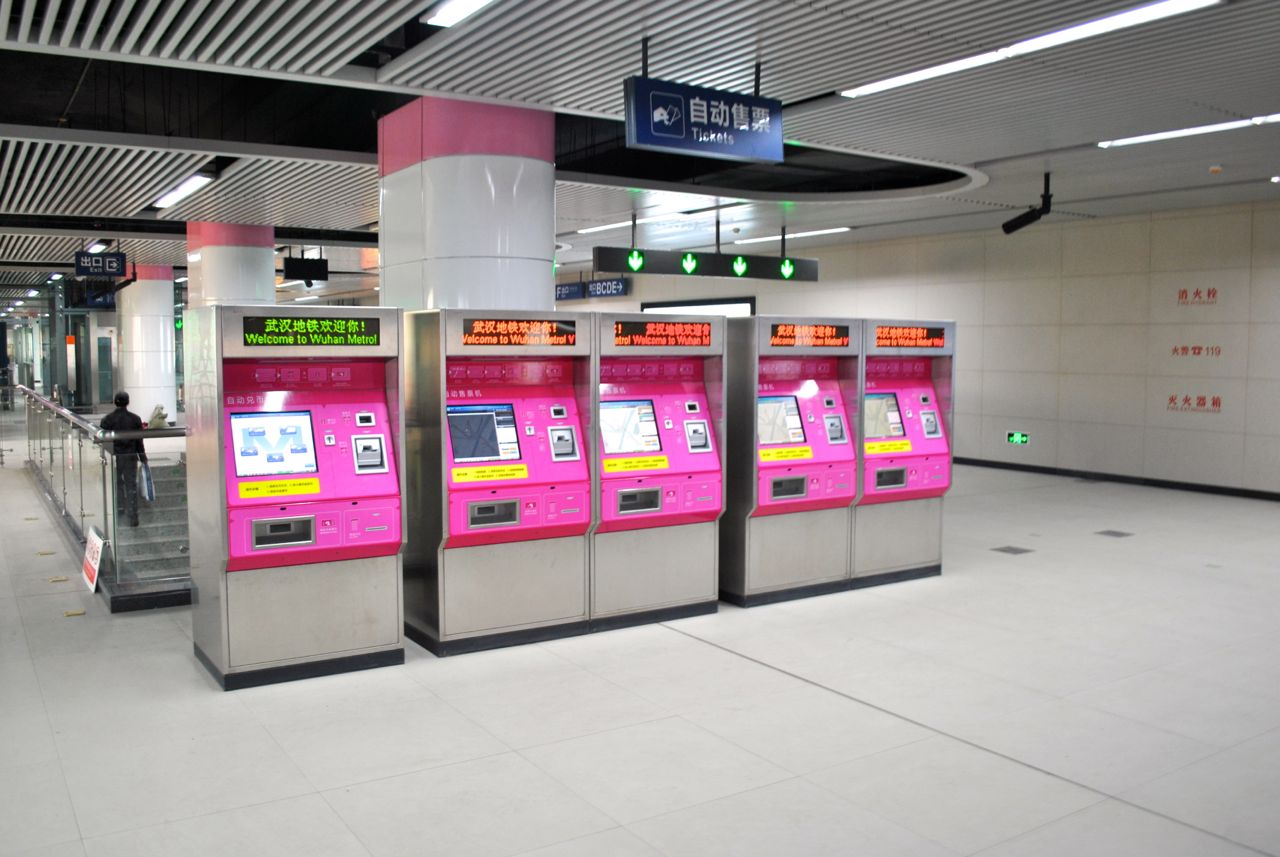
Ticket vending machines

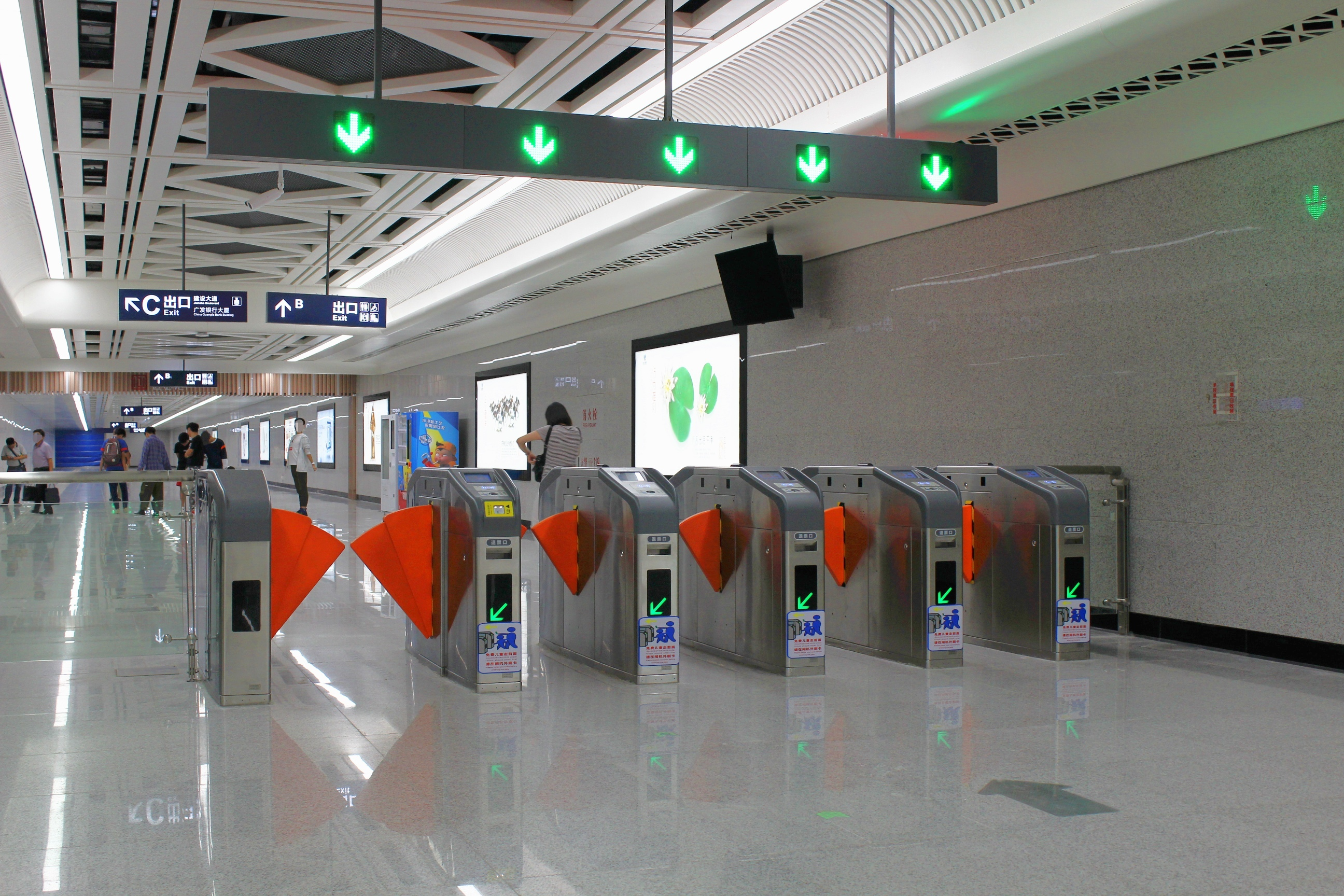
Faregates

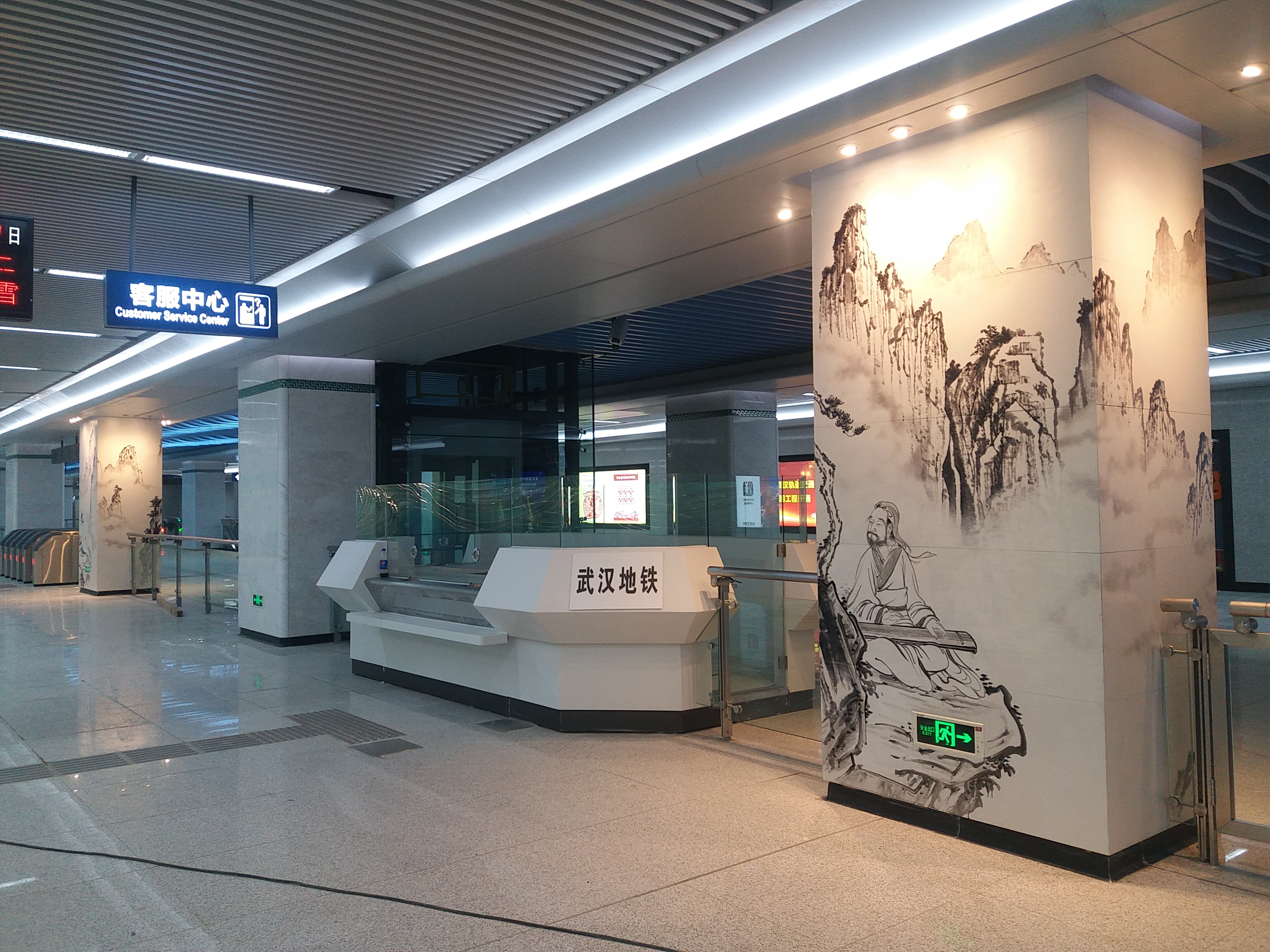
Customer service center

==== Discount ====
Most passagers enter and exit the system using a proximity card called Wuhan Tong, which is available at all metro stations. Passagers who pay metro fare with a Wuhan Tong Card can receive a 10% discount. Besides the metro, Passengers can also pay tram, bus, and ferry fees by Wuhan Tong within Wuhan.

==== Multi-day pass ====
There are three kinds of multi-day pass cards valid for one, three, and seven days respectively.

- One-day pass: ¥18 each and valid for 1 day;
- Three-day pass: ¥45 each and valid for 3 days;
- Seven-day pass: ¥90 each and valid for 7 days.

Cardholders may enjoy one, three, or seven days of unlimited rides in the metro system. The multi-day pass cards are available at the Customer Service Centres in the metro stations. In addition, a RMB 20 deposit is charged for each multi-day pass card.

=== Amenities ===
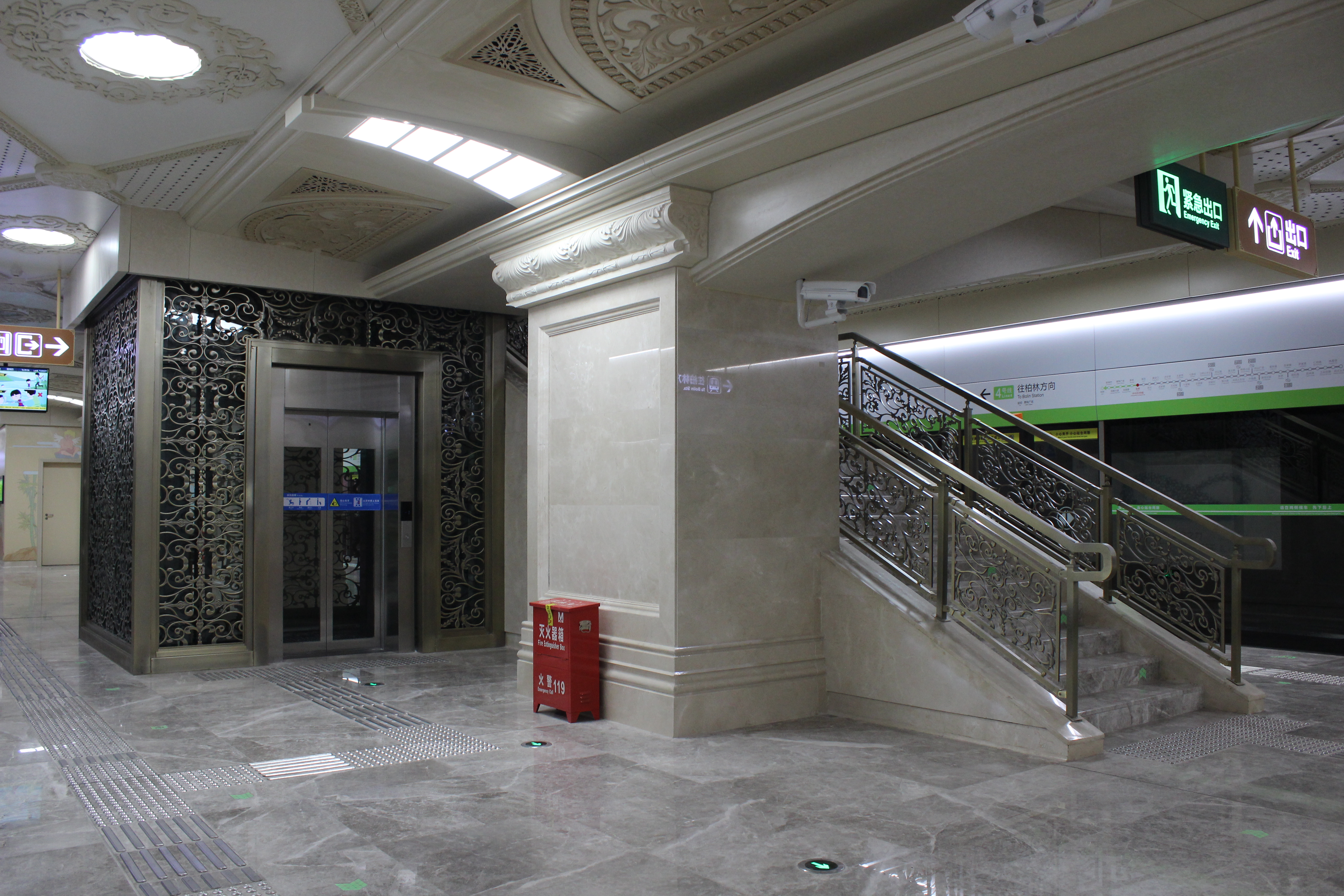
Lift on the platform

4G LTE services are provided in all stations and trains. As Line 1 was put into operation earlier, it lacks in some facilities. For more amenity information, please see the table below. It is worth mentioning that most of the restrooms are set outside the paid area.

Station		Restroom	Lift
Stations on Line 1	Youyi Road, Liji North Road, Chongren Road, Qiaokou Road, Taipingyang Station	unavailable	unequipped
Stations on Line 1	Huangpu Road, Sanyang Road, Dazhi Road, Xunlimen, Zongguan Station	available	unequipped
Stations on Line 1	The rest	available	equipped
Stations on other lines		available	equipped

=== Food ban ===
Wuhan was the first city in mainland China to ban food and drinks on the subway on December 28, 2013, dishing out fines of up to RMB200. On 1 April 2020, a nationwide food ban was enacted, which also includes conduct rules cracking down on bad subway etiquette, such as stepping on seats, lying down on a bench or floor and playing music or videos out loud.

== Rolling stock ==
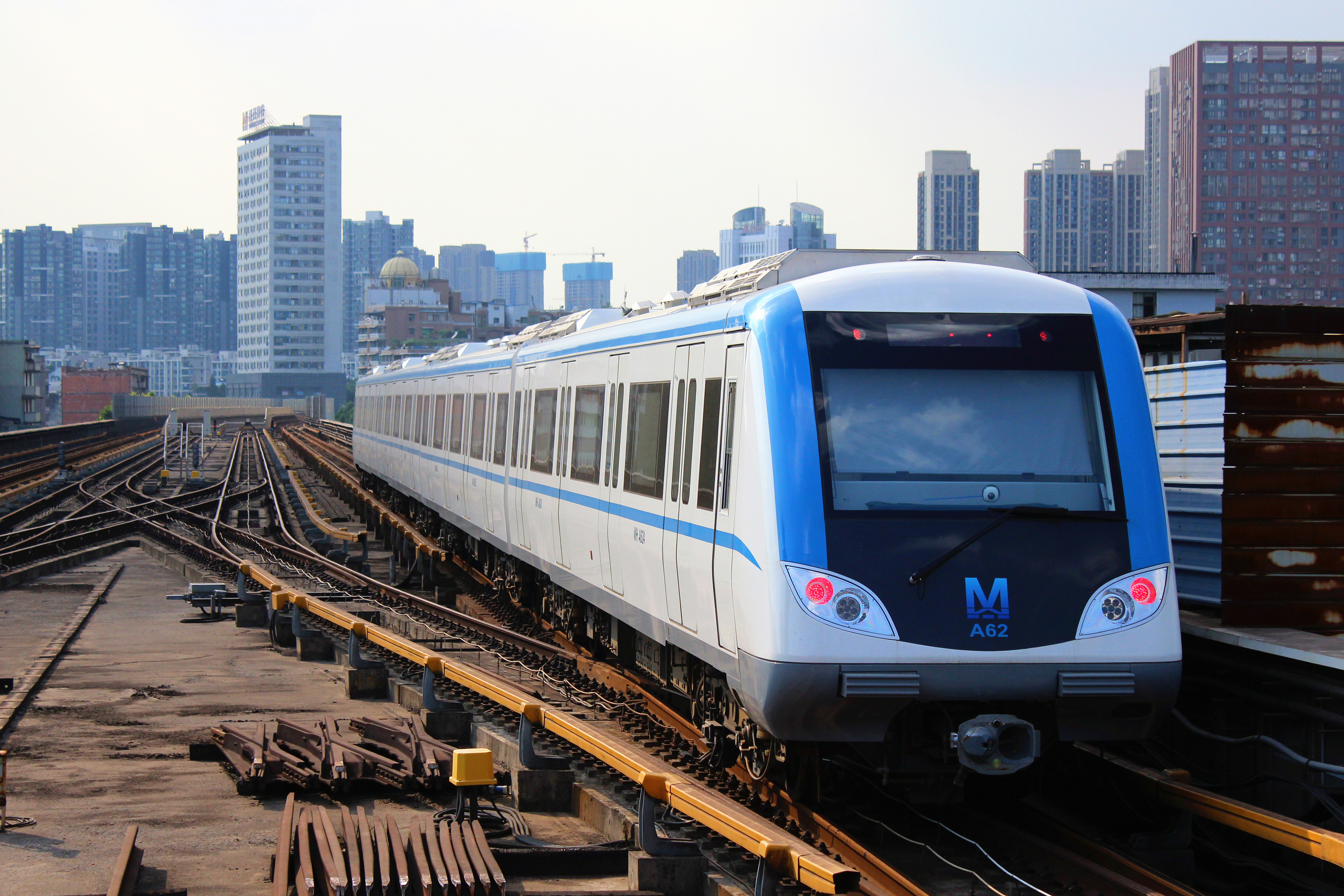
Line 1

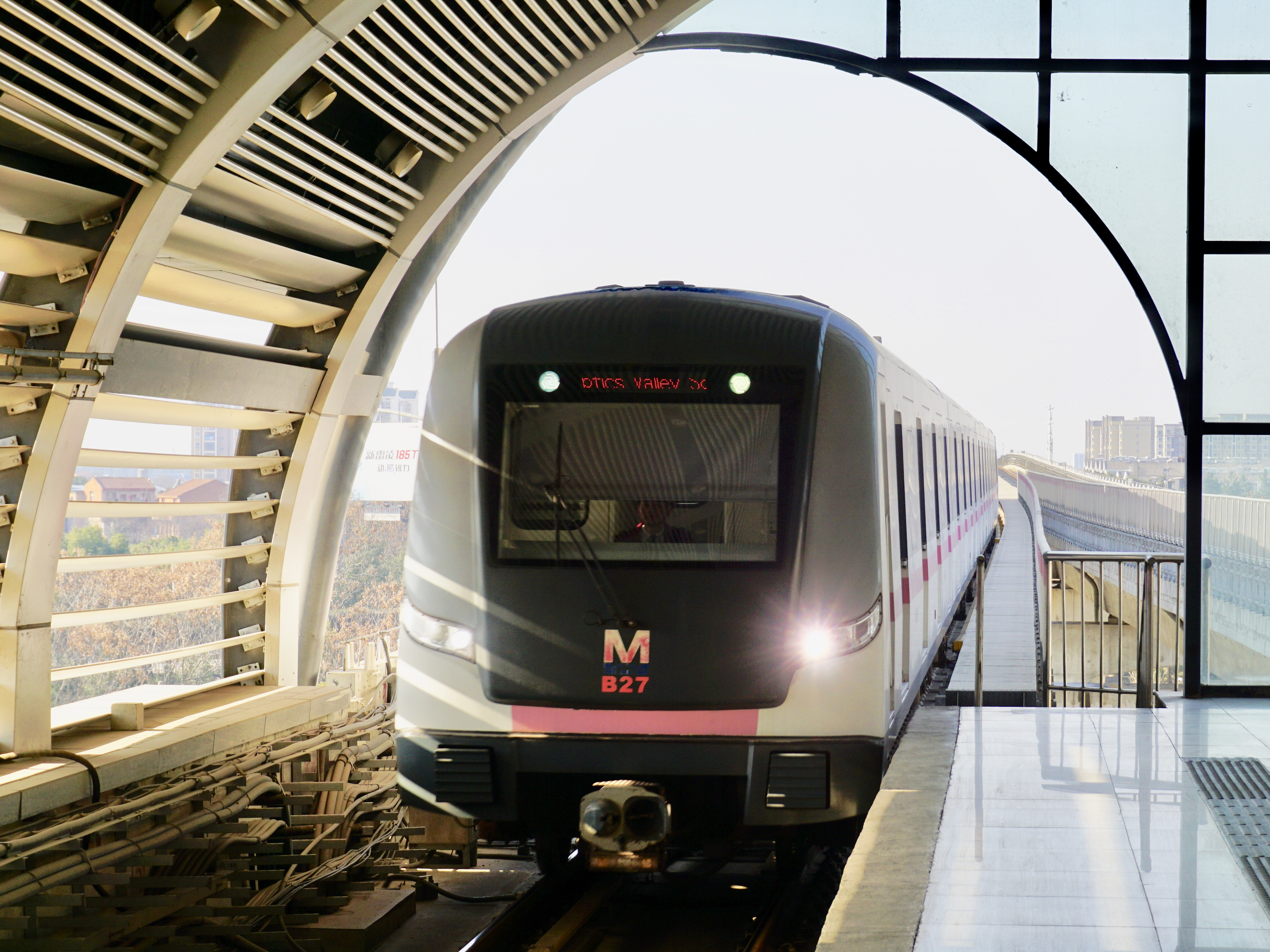
Line 2

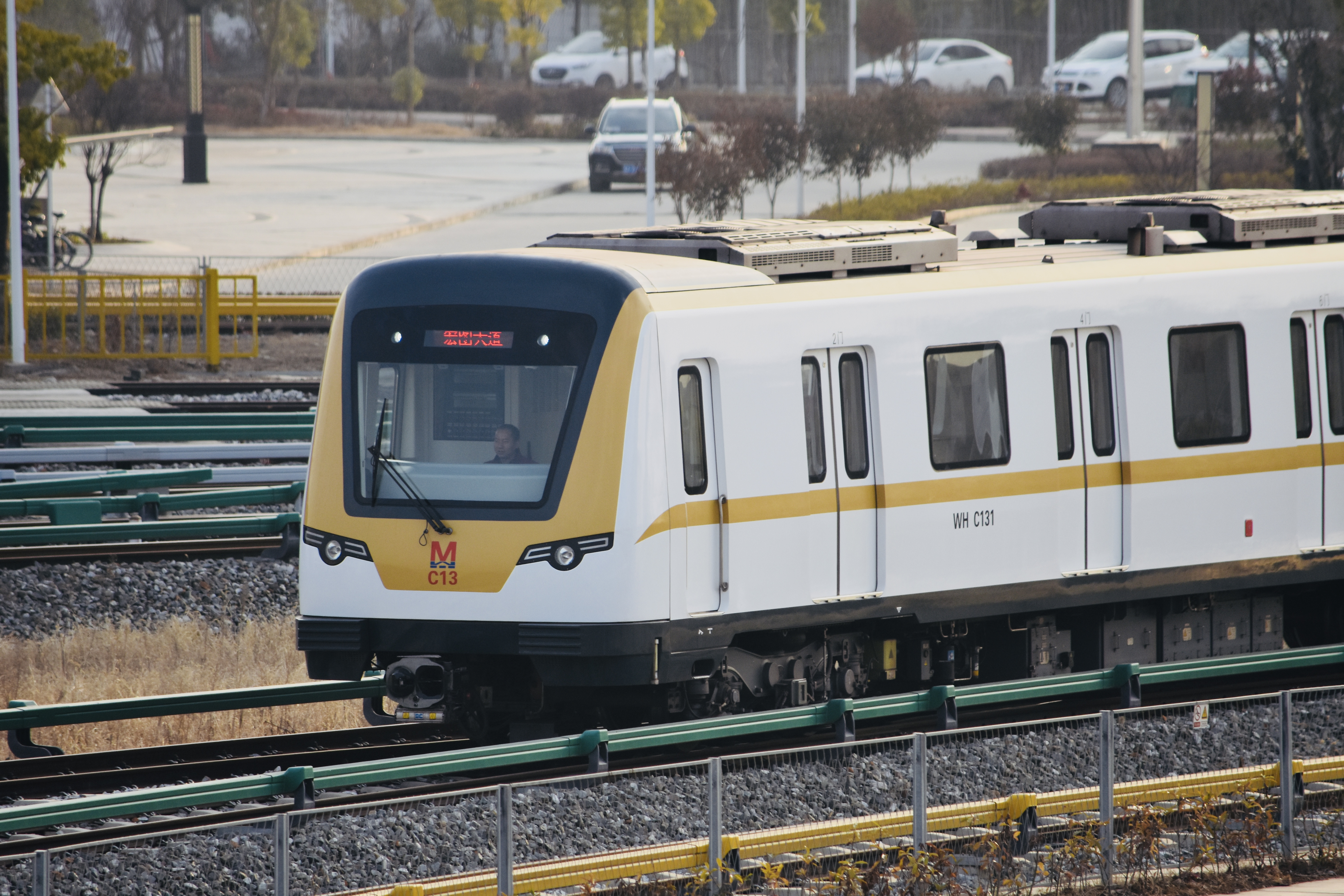
Line 3

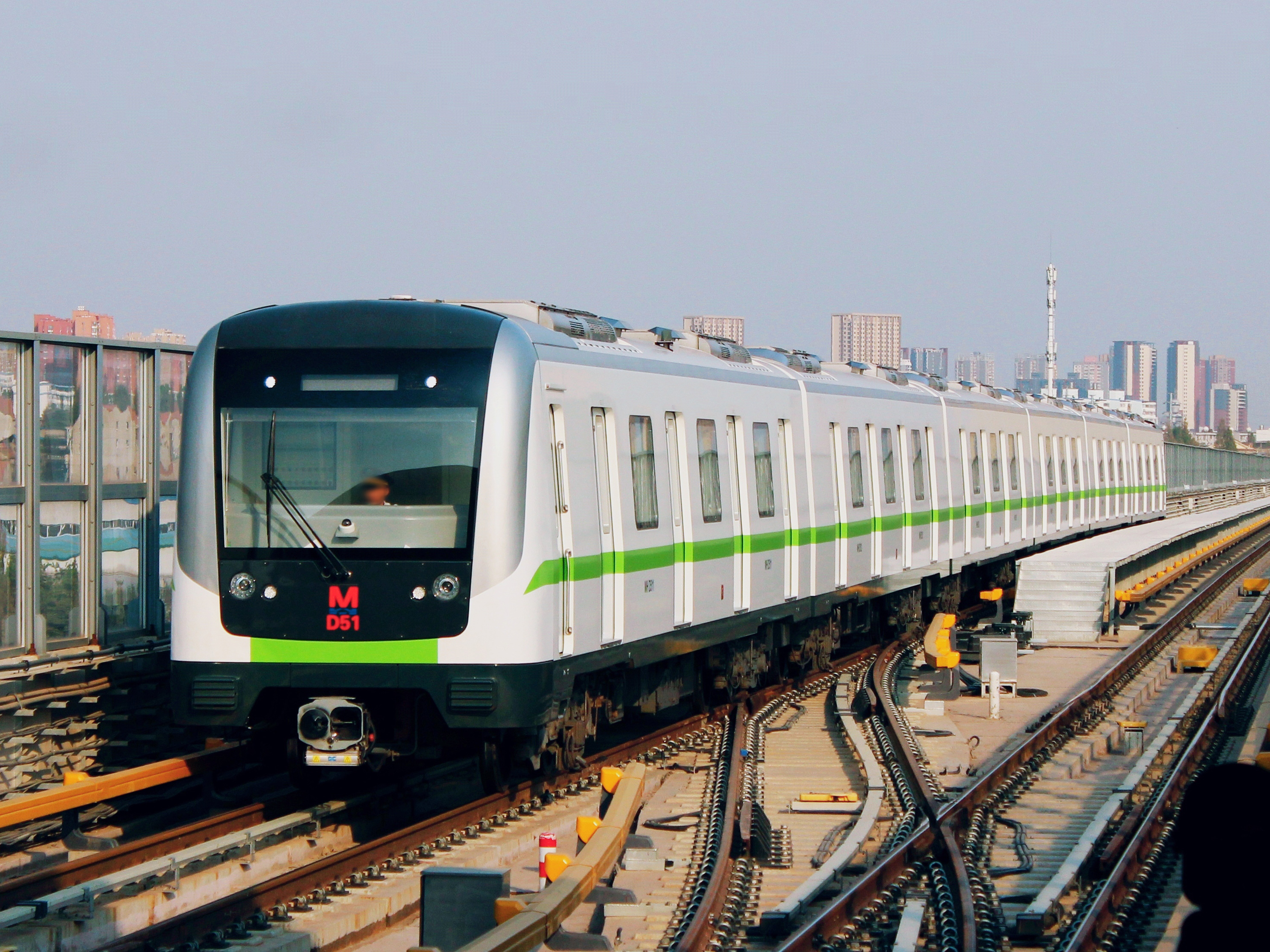
Line 4

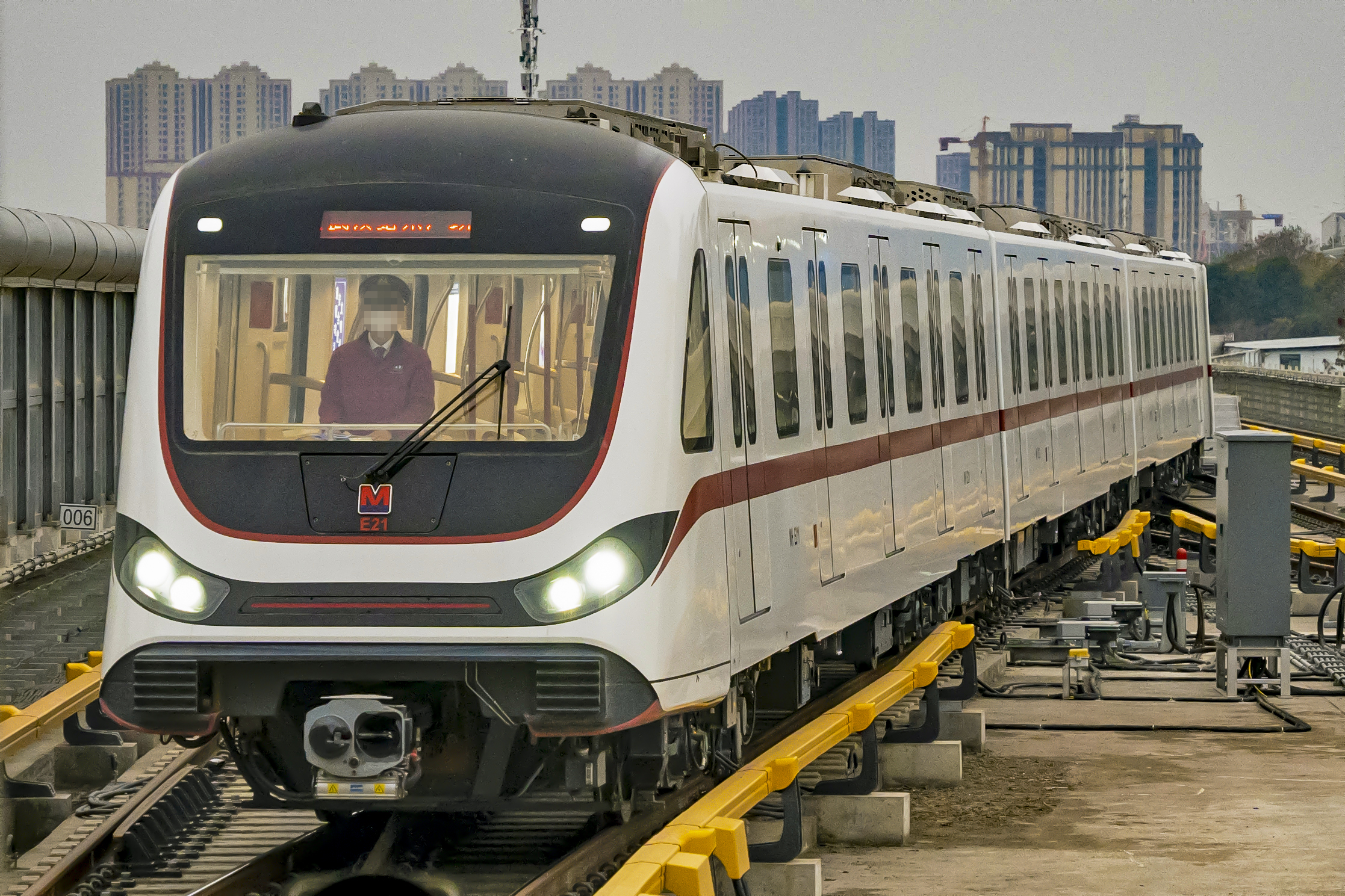
Line 5

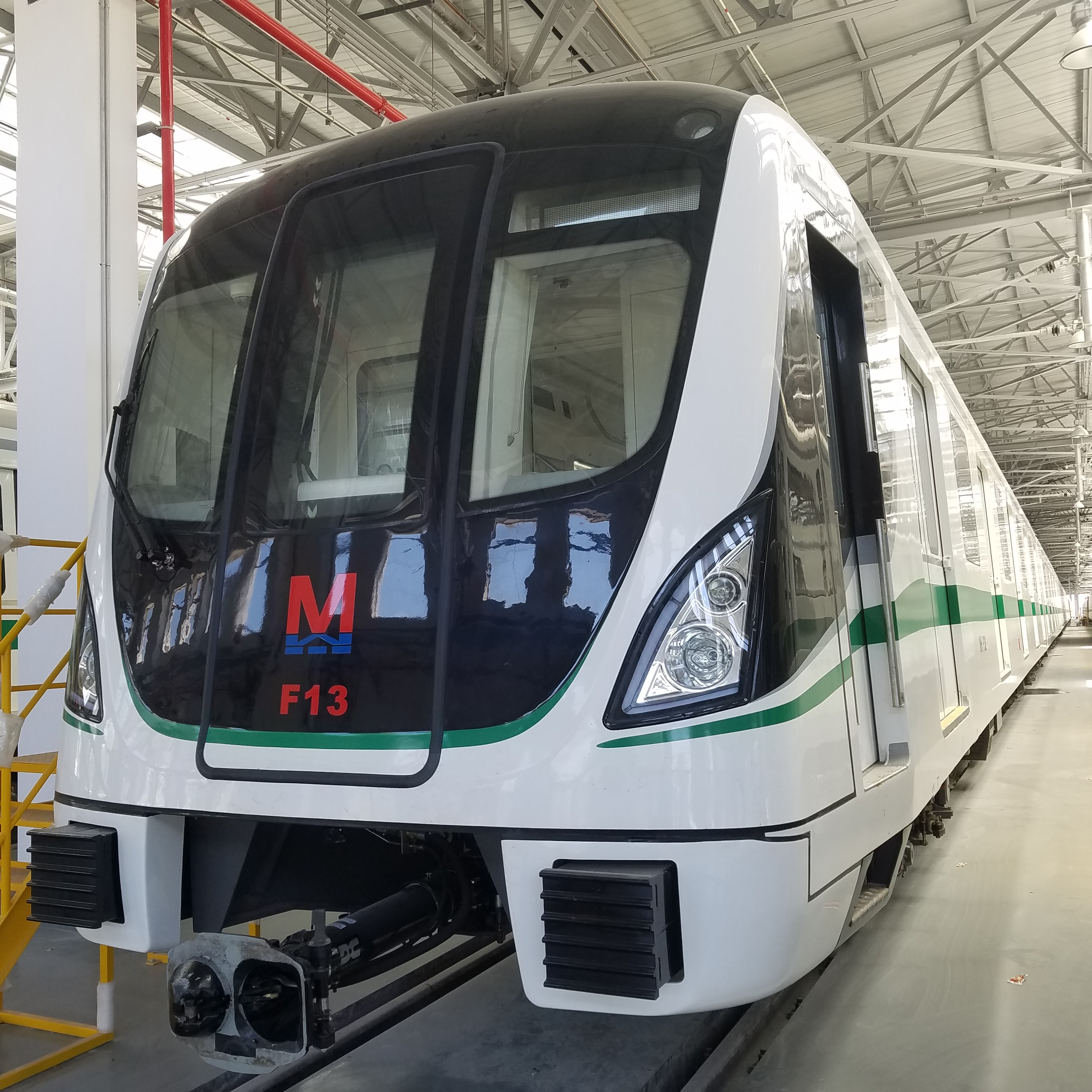
Line 6

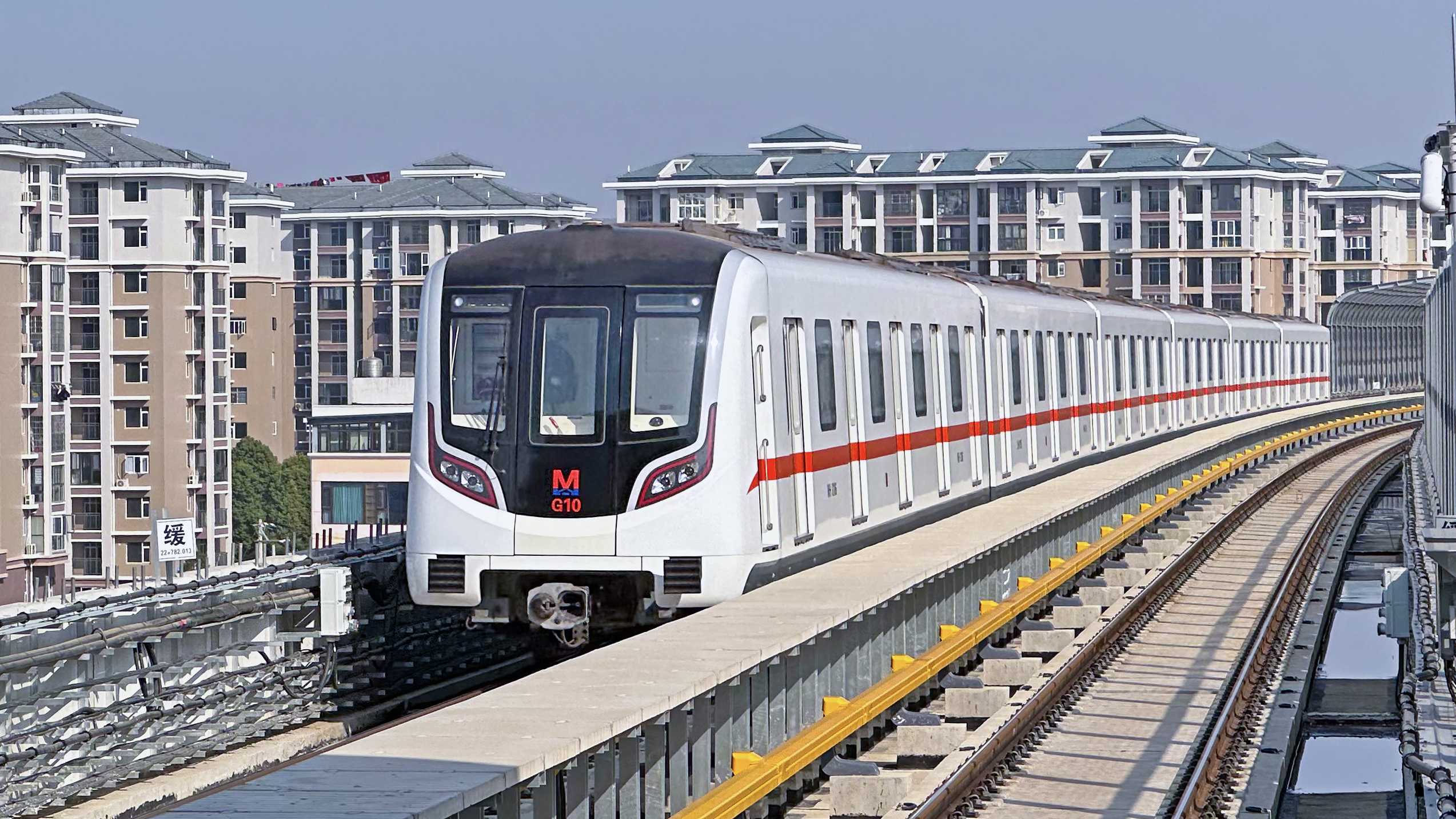
Line 7

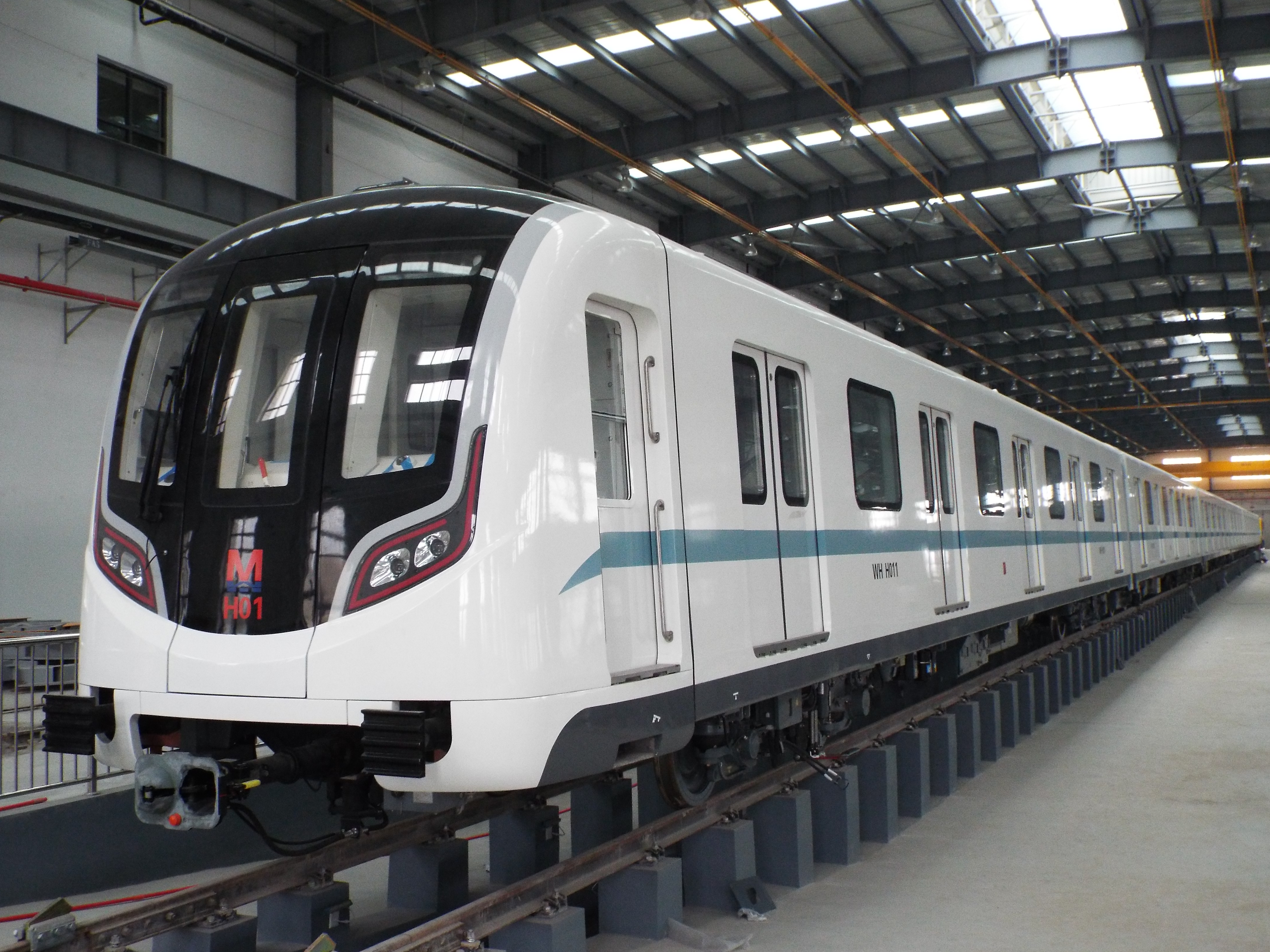
Line 8

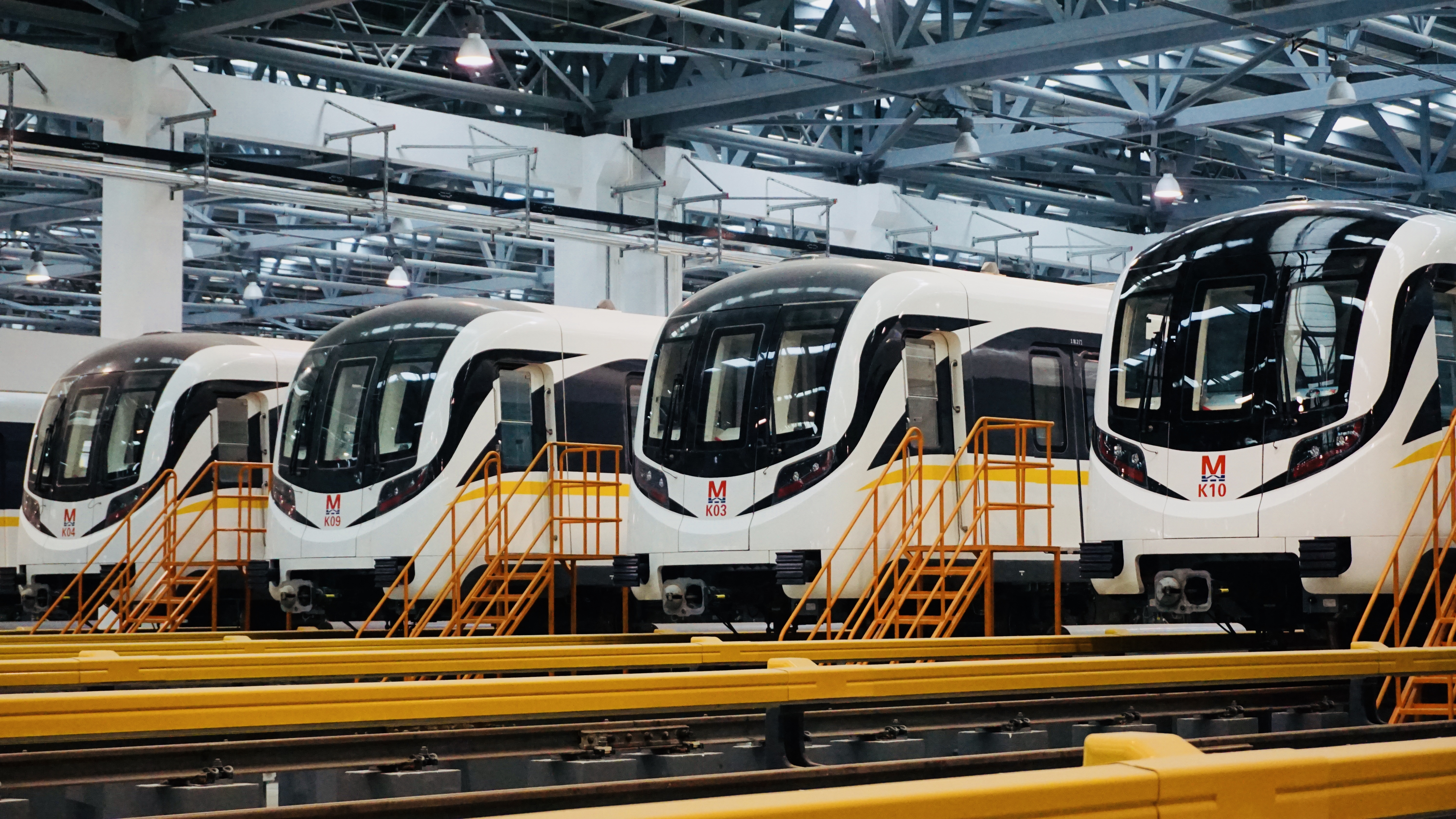
Line 11

Line 12

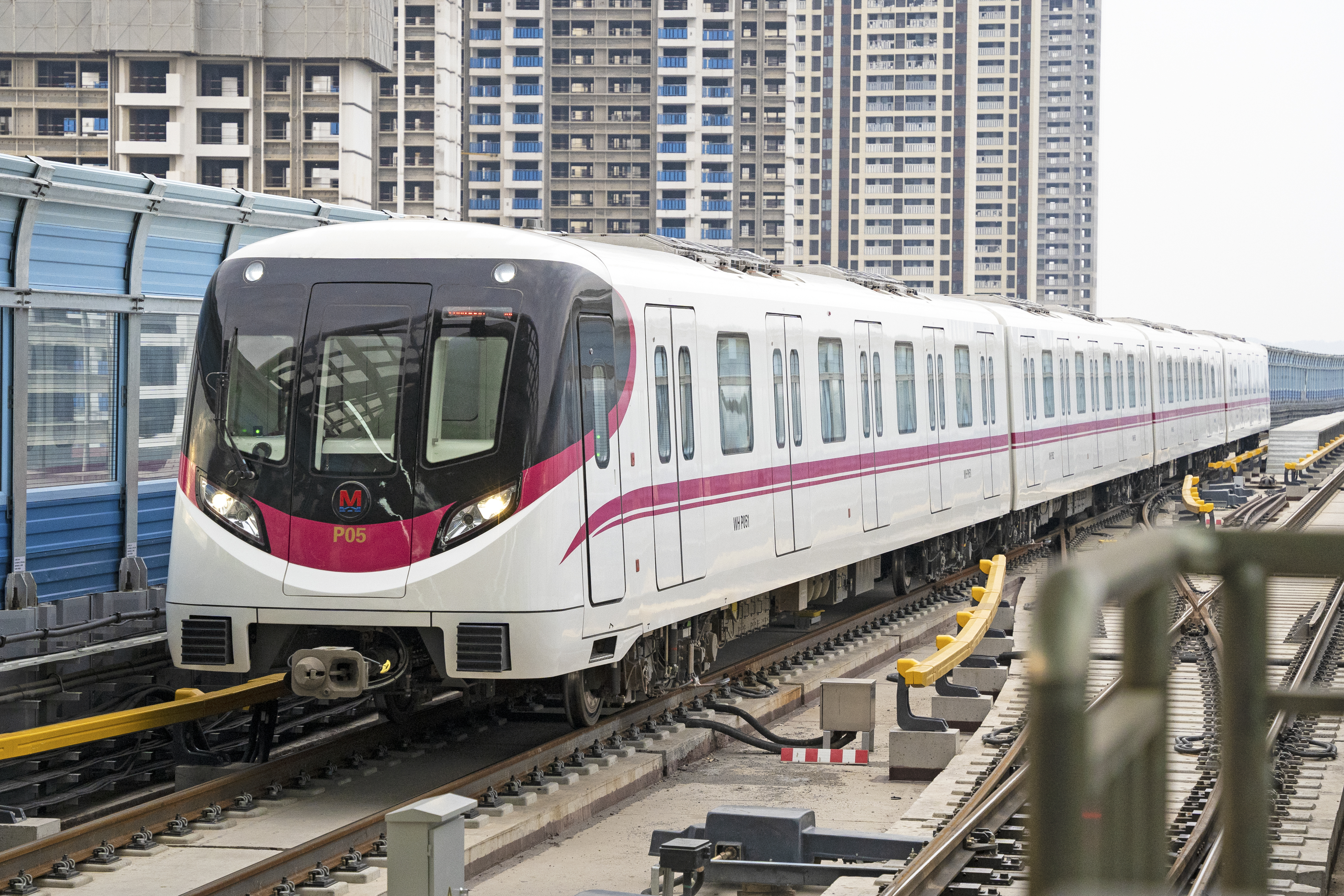
Line 16

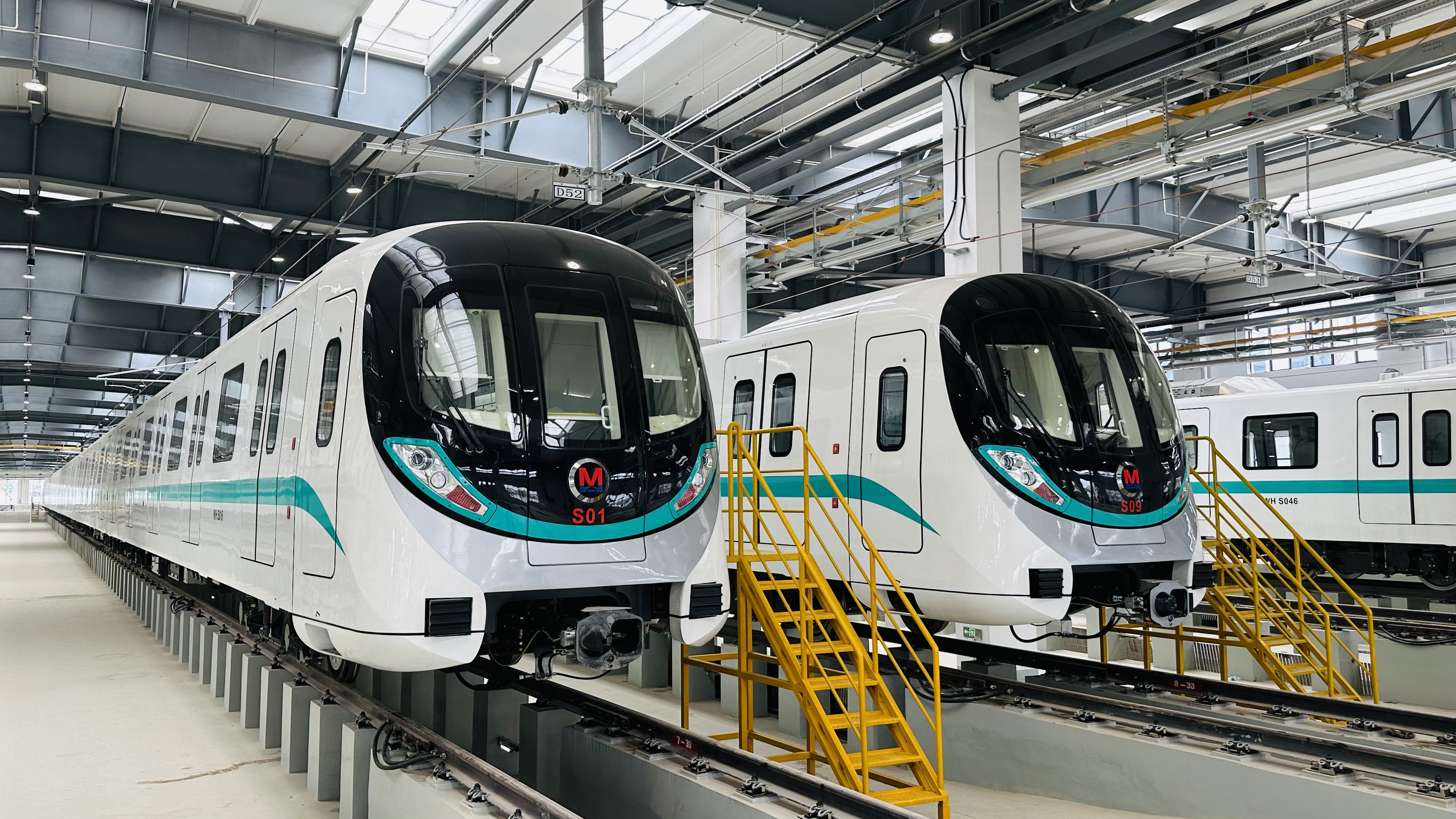
Line 19

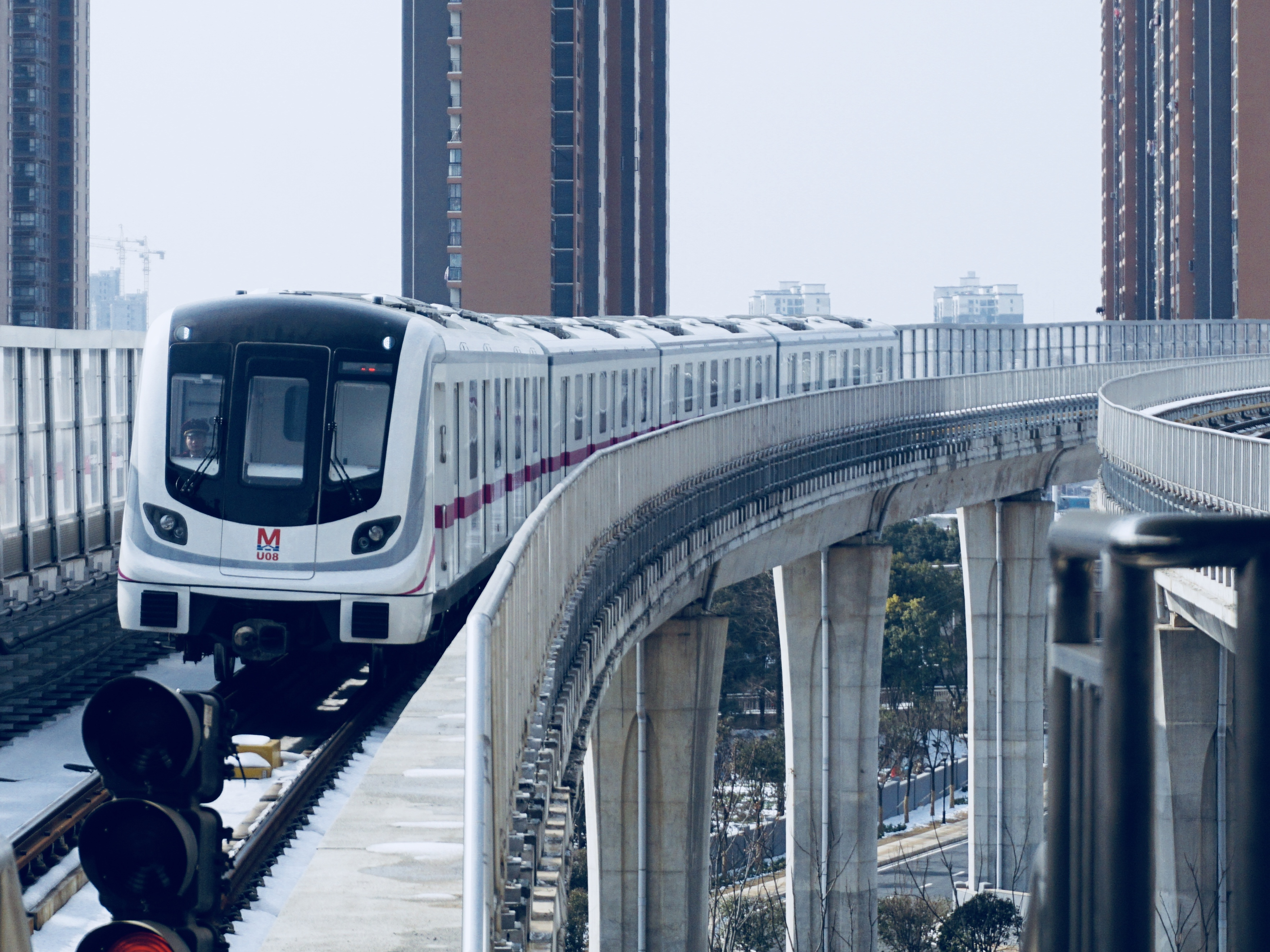
Yangluo Line

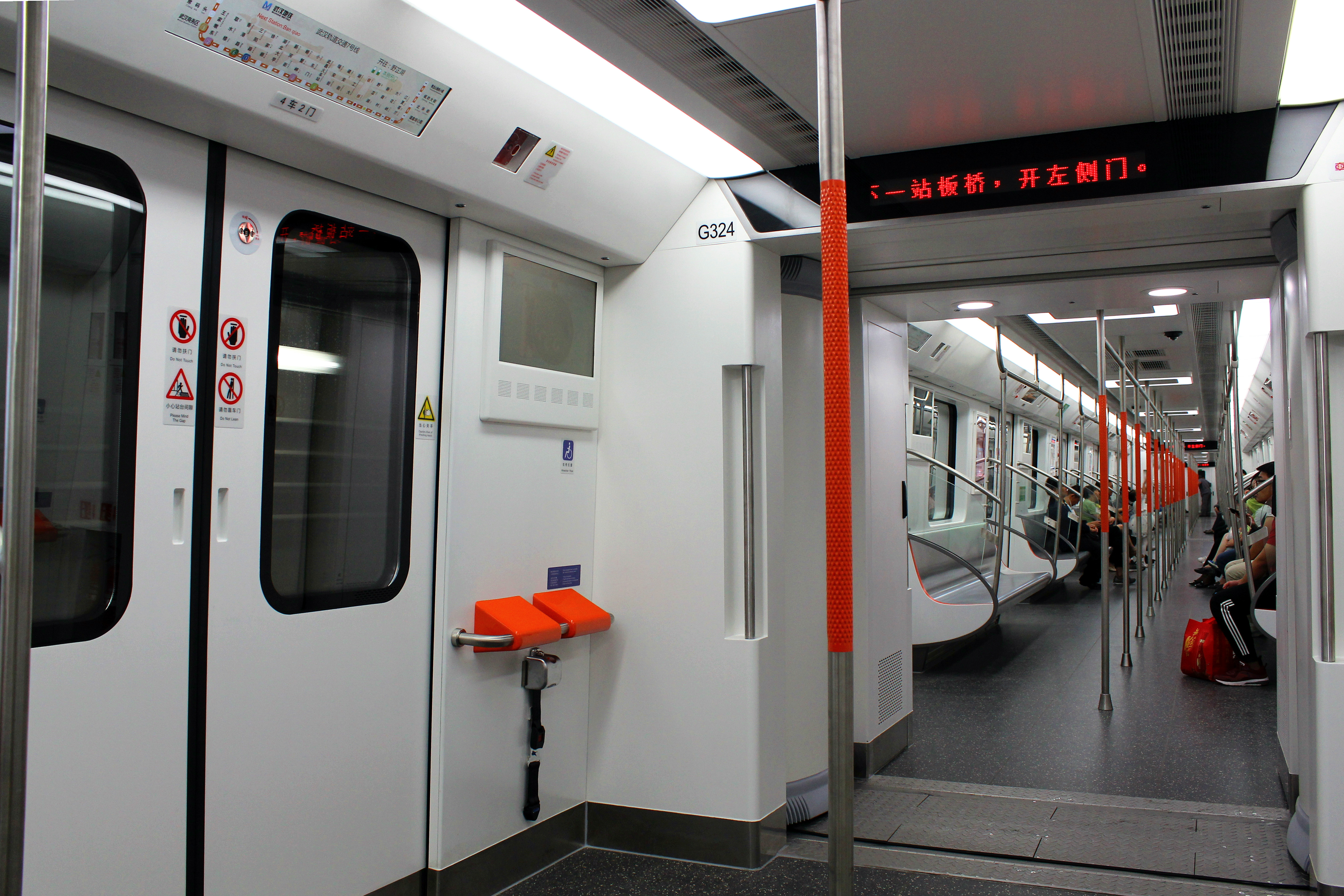
Train interior of Line 7

Train interior of Line 11

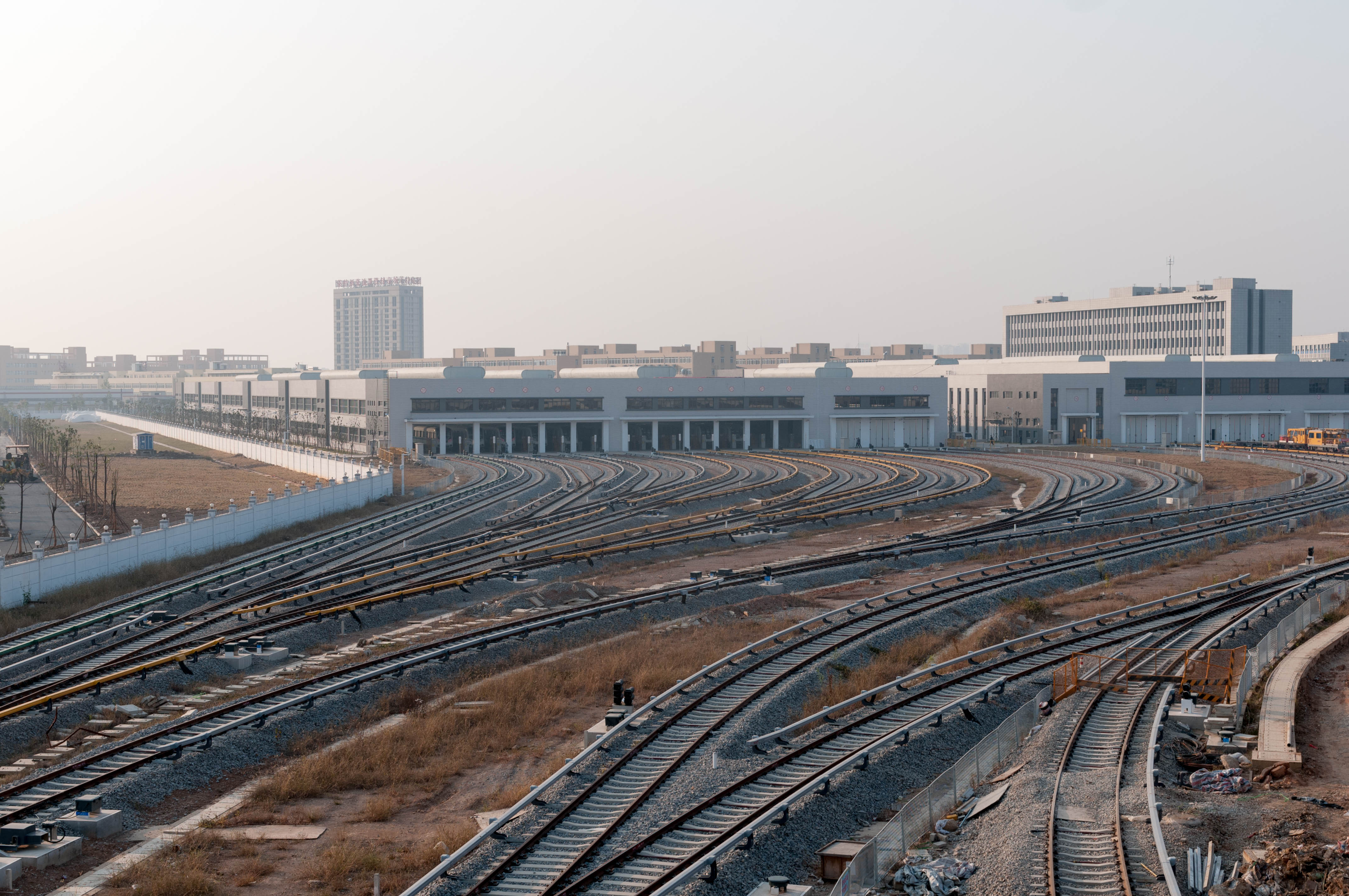
Sanjintan Depot of Line 8

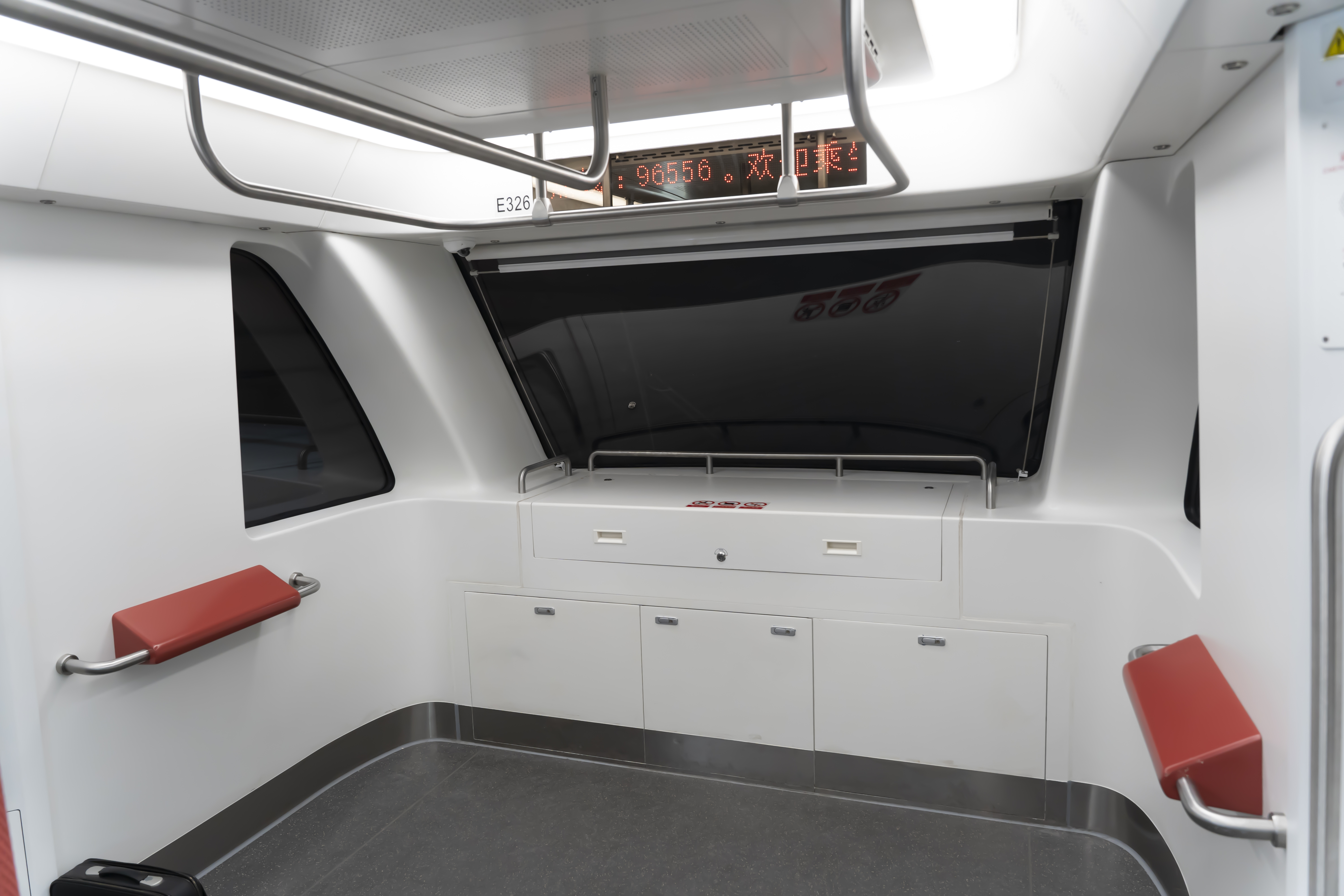
Train cab of Line 5, which is the first fully automated (GoA4) metro line in Wuhan

== Signalling ==
Wuhan Metro Line 1 is the first one equipped with moving block system in China. All the lines are equipped with CBTC. A fully automated, driverless train system (GoA4), provided by Traffic Control Technology Corporation Limited, has been applied to Line 5 since 26 December 2021.

== Ridership ==
Since 2012, the ridership of the entire network has grown as the new lines or sections come into operation every year. The following data were released by the Wuhan Statistics Bureau, however, the data before 2007 are unavailable. The sudden drop in ridership in 2020 was due to the COVID-19 Pandemic in China, with Hubei, and Wuhan specifically being the worst affected area in China.

Annual ridership
Year	Ridership (in million)
2007	9.26
2008	11.06(+19.44%)
2009	13.17(+19.08%)
2010	33.00(+150.57%)
2011	77.37(+134.45%)
2012	82.88(+7.12%)
2013	273.43(+229.91%)
2014	356.24(+30.29%)
2015	565.10(+58.63%)
2016	716.59(+26.81%)
2017	926.83(+29.34%)
2018	1,040.54(+12.27%)
2019	1,229.03(+18.11%)
2020	621.60(-49.42%)
2021	1,012.70(+62.92%)
2022	894.24(-11.70%)
2023	1,352.84(+51.28%)
2024	1,468(+8.51%)
2025	1,443(-1.70%)

Passengers waiting in line for the train during the rush hours
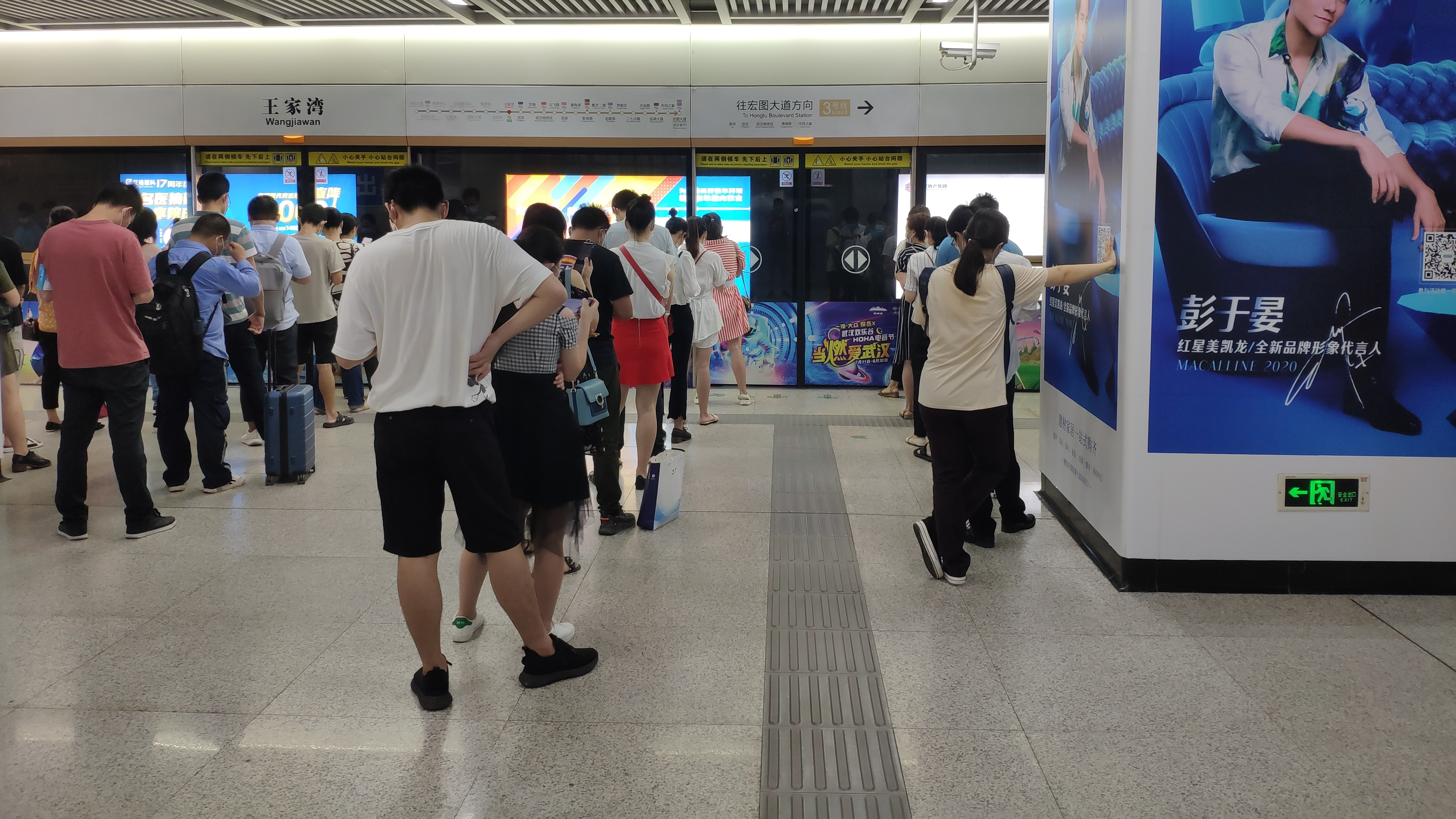
Wangjiawan Station

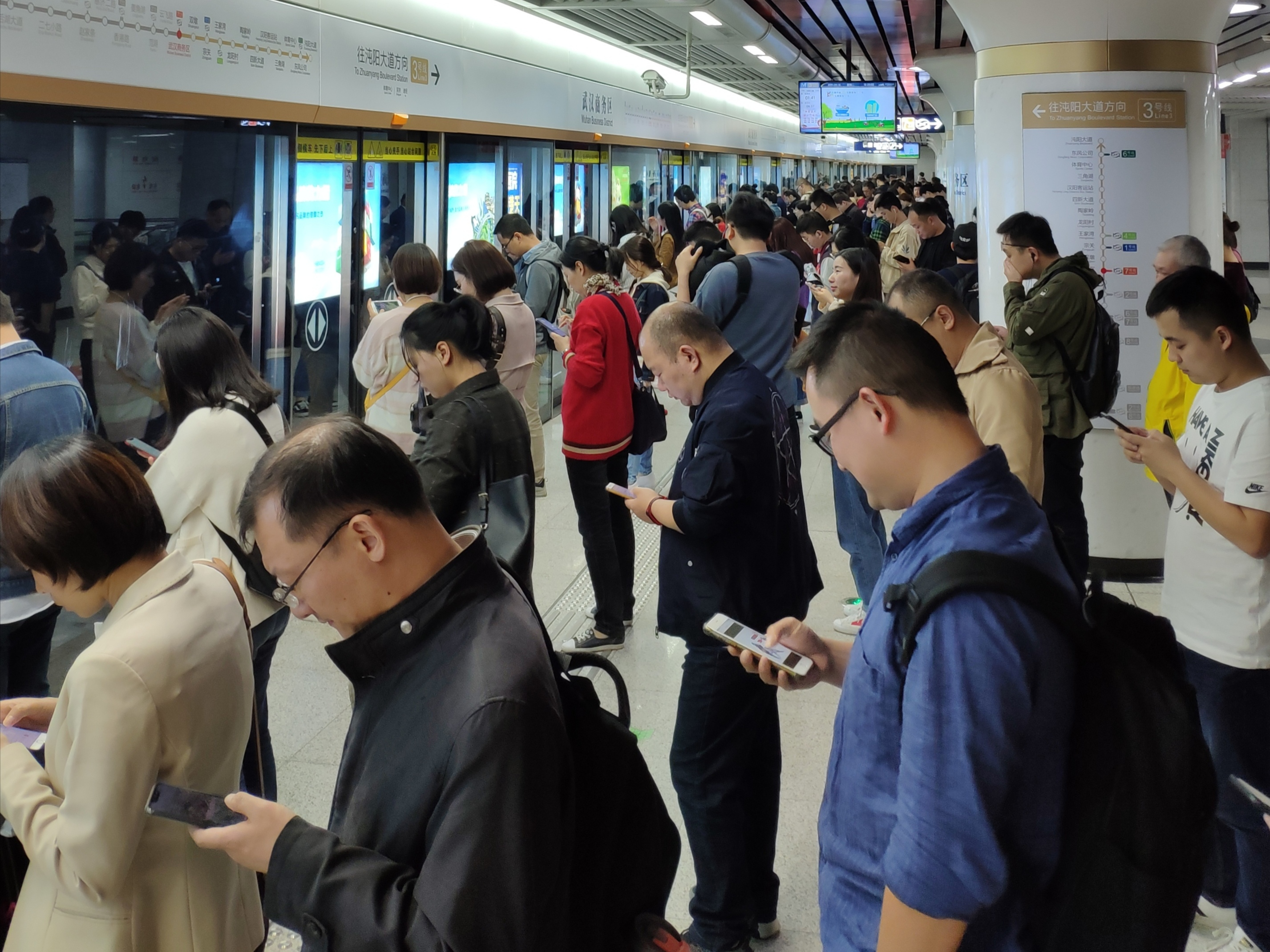
Wuhan Business District Station

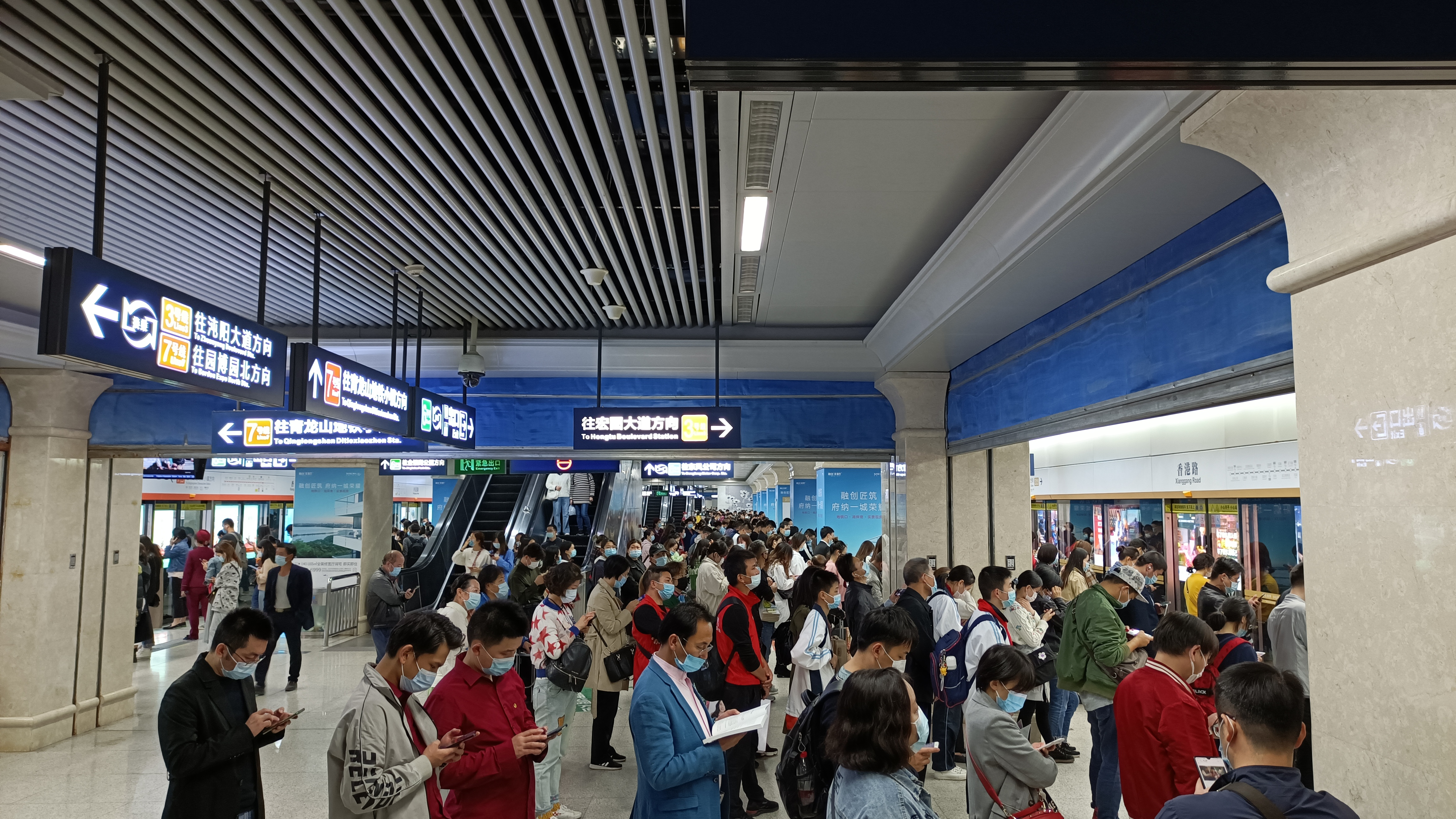
Xianggang Road Station

== Future expansion ==
Wuhan Metro future expansion diagram

A number of lines are under construction. Line 9, 10, as well as Line 13, are being planned by the municipal authority.

Planned Opening	Line	Section	Termini		Length km	Stations	Status
2028	Xingang	West ext.	Huaihai Road	Beiyangqiao	20.3	9	Under construction
2028	11	Phase 4	Wuhan West Railway Station	Jiang'an Road	16.6	6	Under Construction
2027-2028	Xingang	Phase 1	Beiyangqiao	Baiyushan	10.9	5	Under construction
2027-2028	3	Phase 2	Zhuanyang Boulevard	Wenling	11.8	5	Under Construction
2027-2028	6	Phase 3	Boyi Road	Dongfeng Motor Corporation	2.2	2	Under construction
2027-2028	11	Phase 3 Remaining section	Huangjinkou	Wuhan West Railway Station	2.2	2	Under Construction
TBD (under planning)	20		Tianhe International Airport	Wuhan Railway Station	30.0	6	Proposed
TBD (under planning)	9		China University of Geosciences	Wulijie		13	Proposed
TBD (under planning)	11		Sino-French Ecological City	Huangjinkou		1	Proposed
TBD (under planning)	15		Qingling North	Jinkou			Proposed
TBD (under planning)	17		Jinghe	Baoxie			Proposed
TBD (under planning)	18		Jinghe	Wuhu			Proposed

== Stations ==
Almost all stations, except the stations on Line 1, are equipped with platform screen doors. There is a plan that stations on Line 1 will be equipped with platform screen doors in the future. The metro stations are equipped to be disabled and elderly friendly, with an automatic fare collection system, announcement system, electronic display boards, escalators and lifts. The stations are also equipped with non-slip flooring, grip-rails, audio announcements and Braille to help visually challenged passengers.

=== Gallery ===
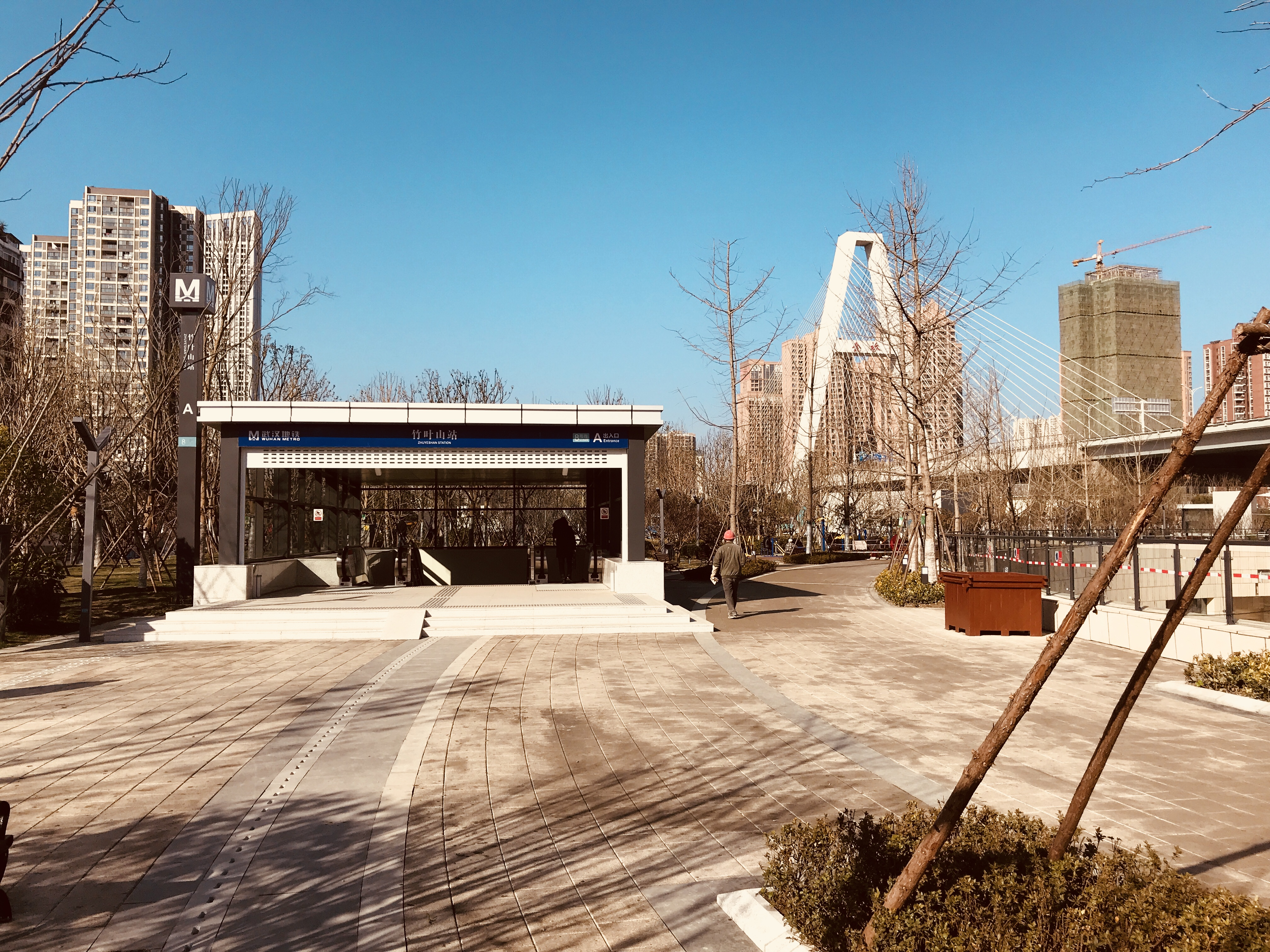
Station entrance

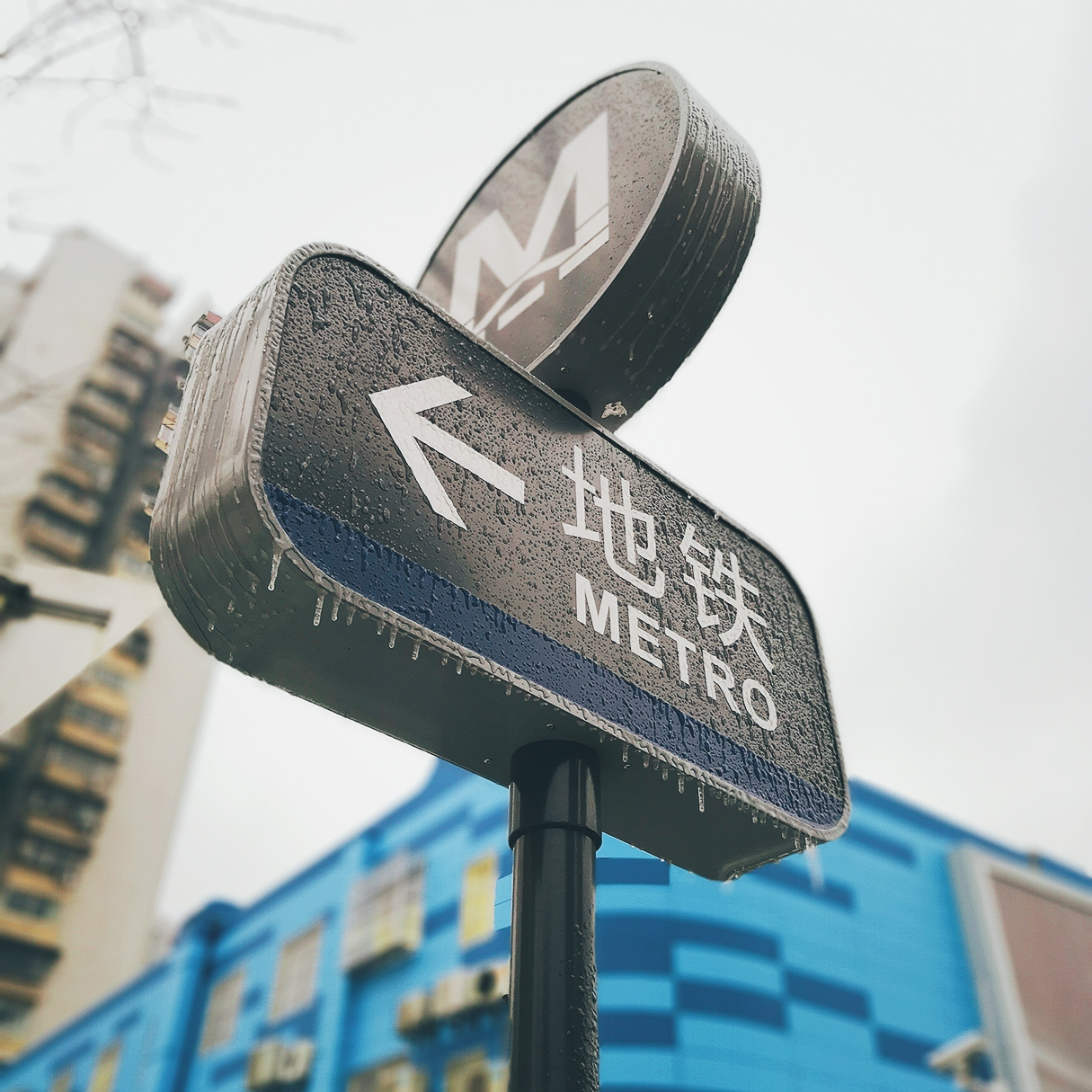
Guidepost

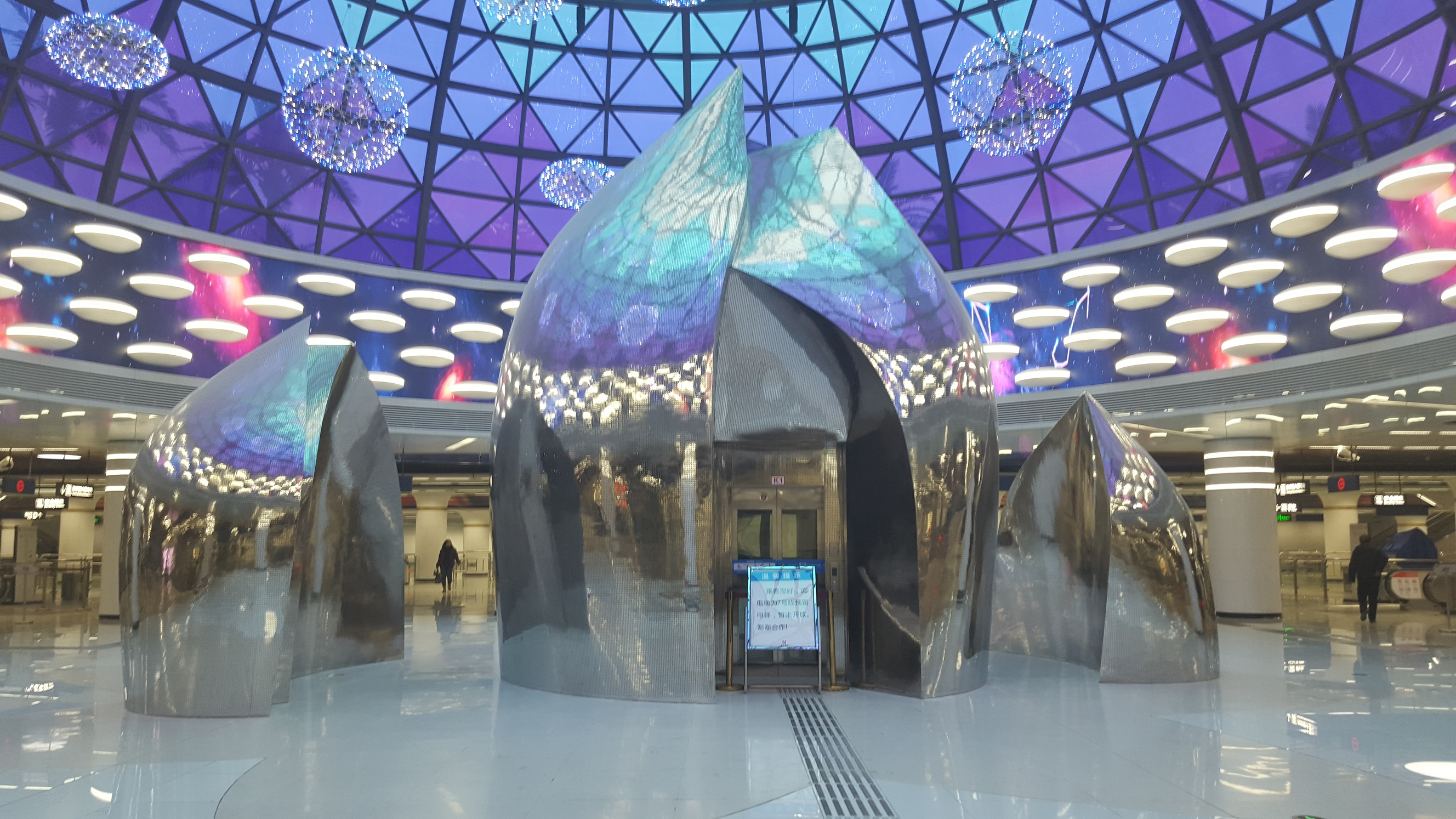
The concourse of Wuhan Business District Station

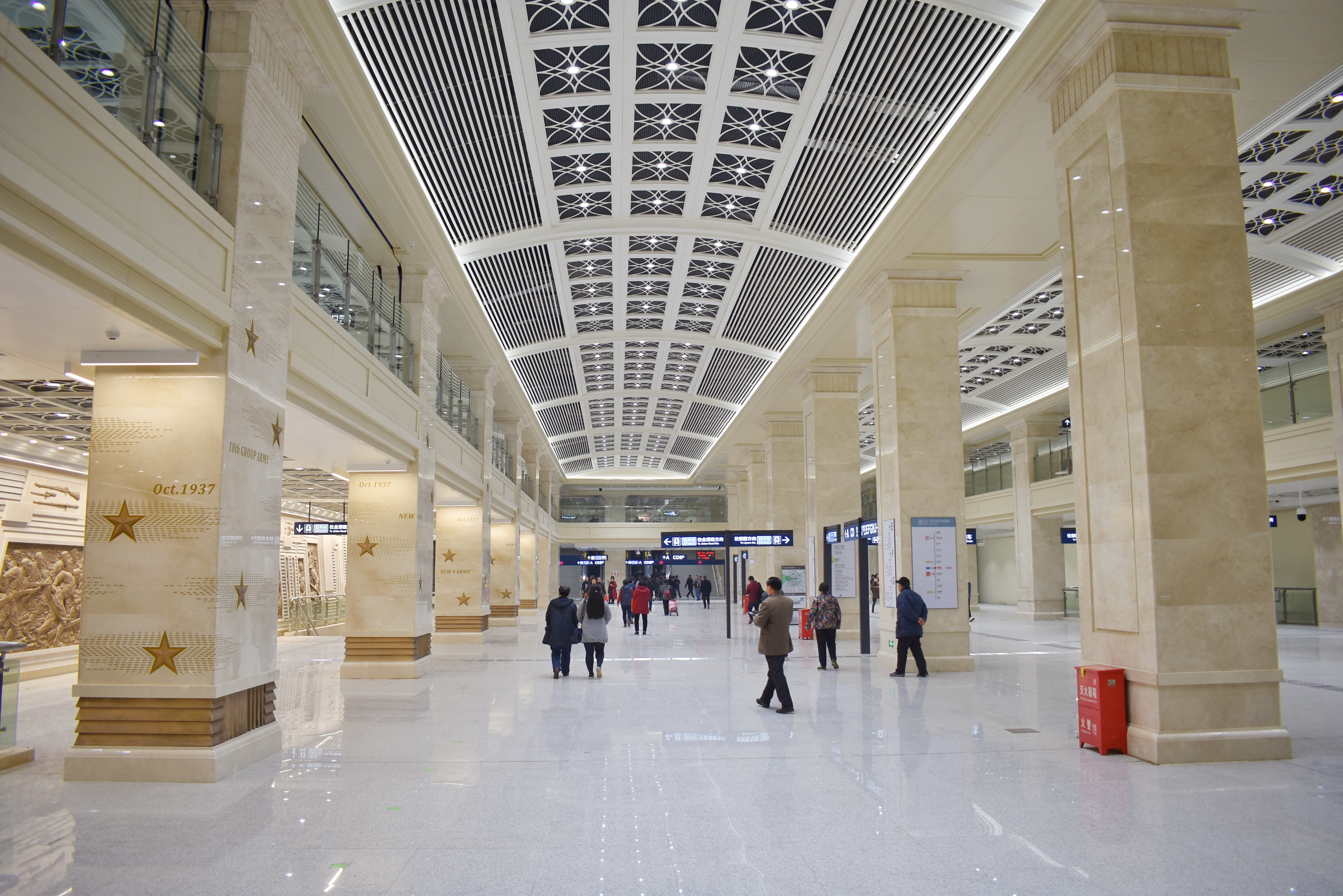
The concourse of Huangpu Road Station, Line 8

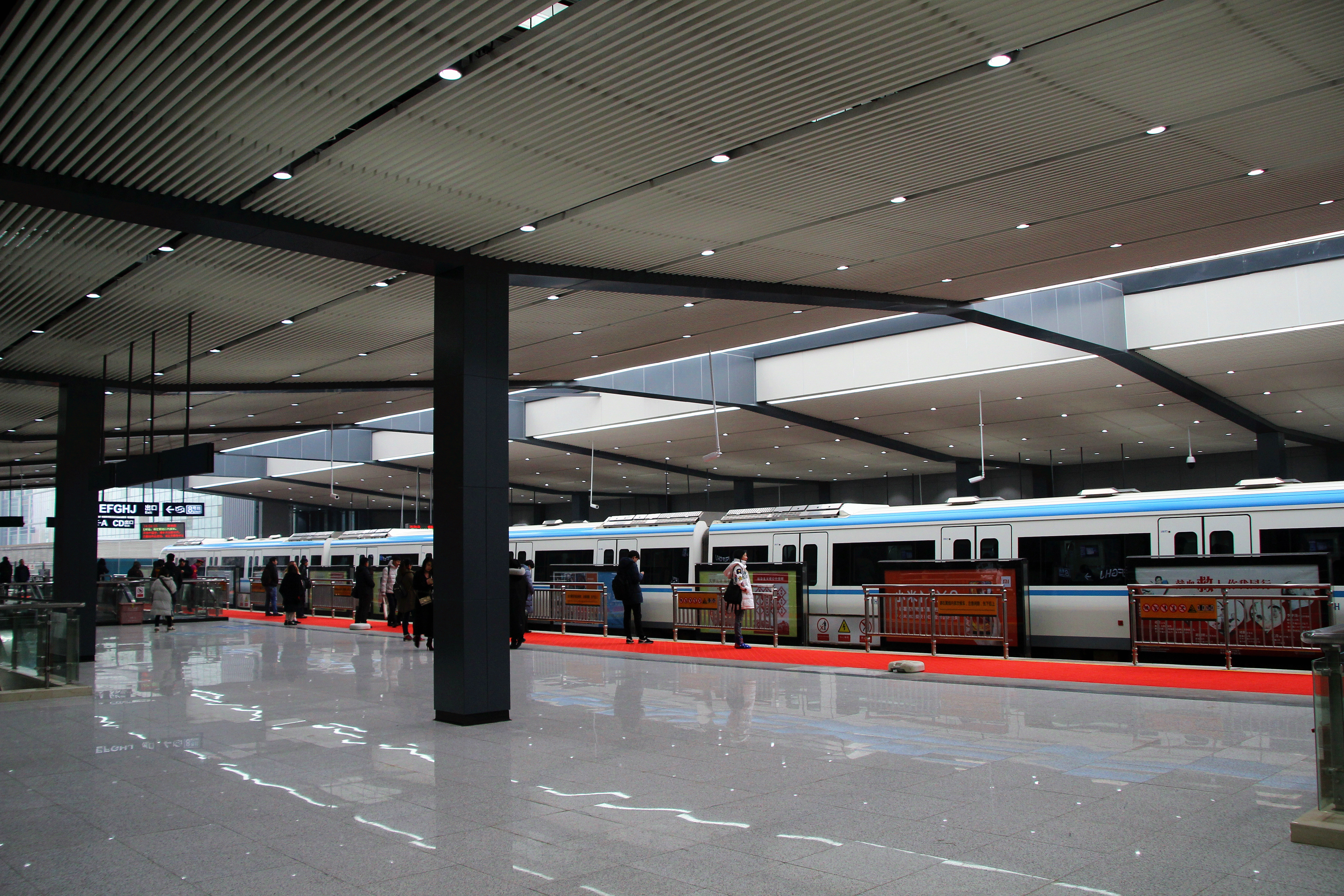
The widened platform of Huangpu Road Station, Line 1

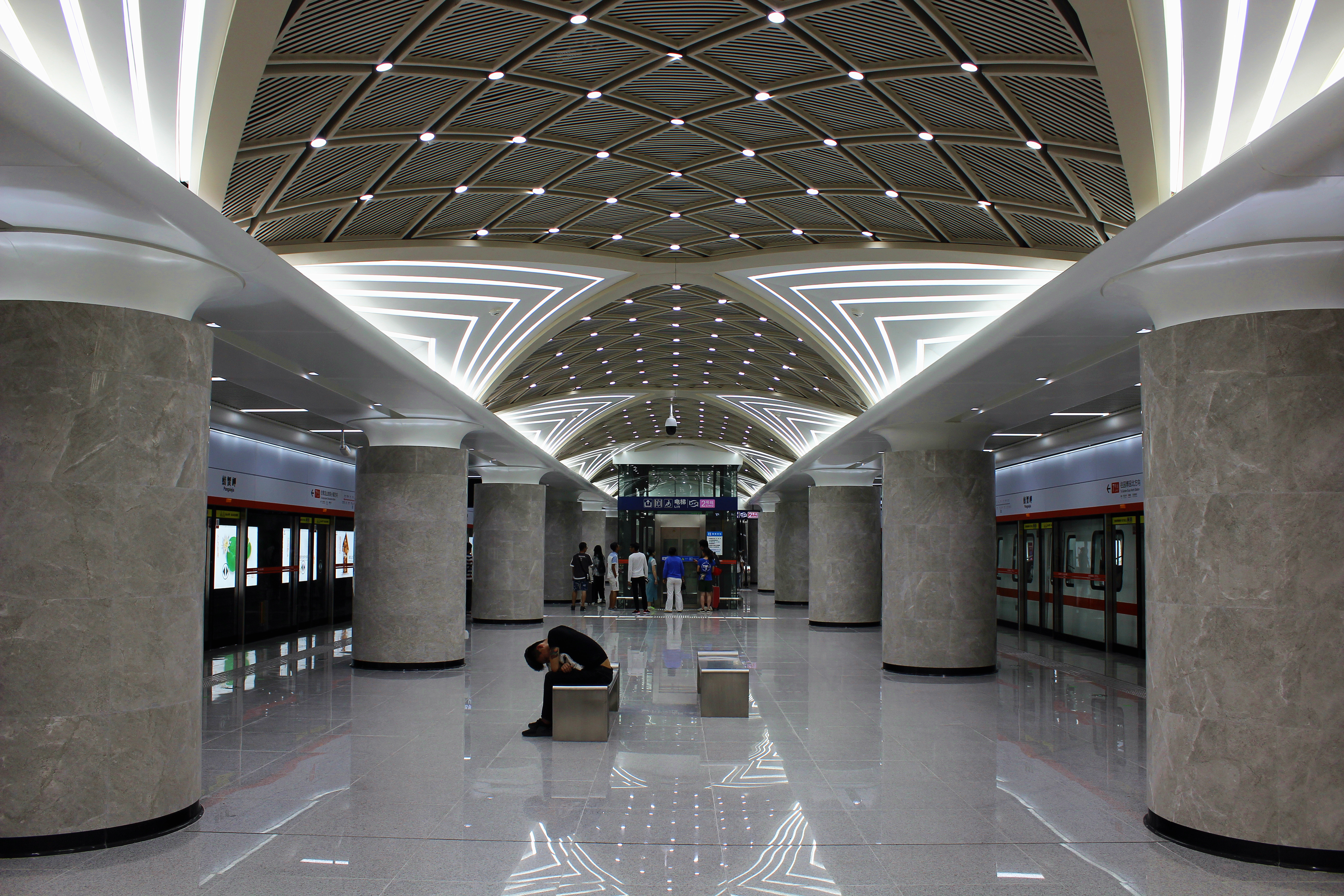
The platform of Pangxiejia Station, Line 7

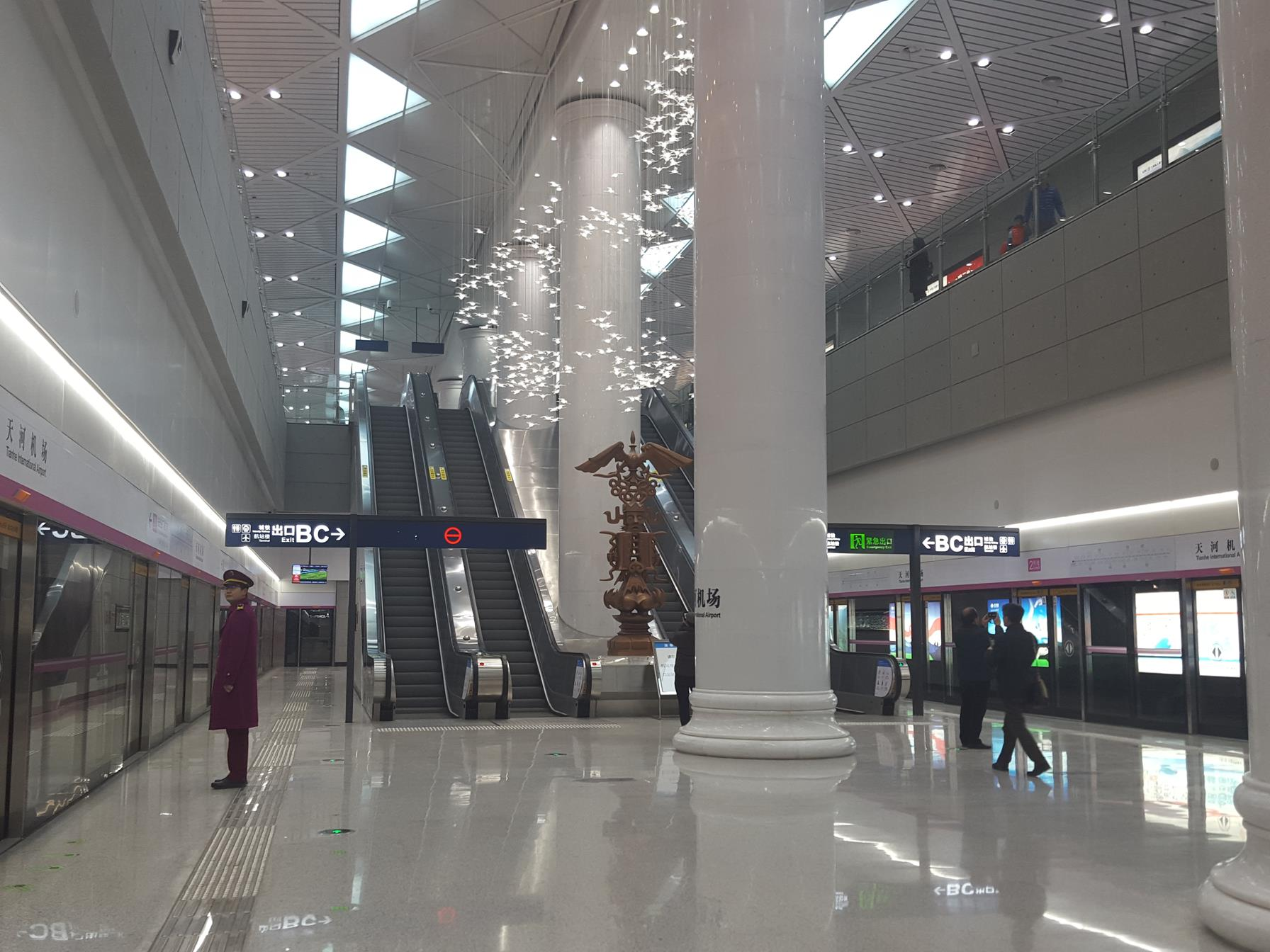
Tianhe International Airport Station

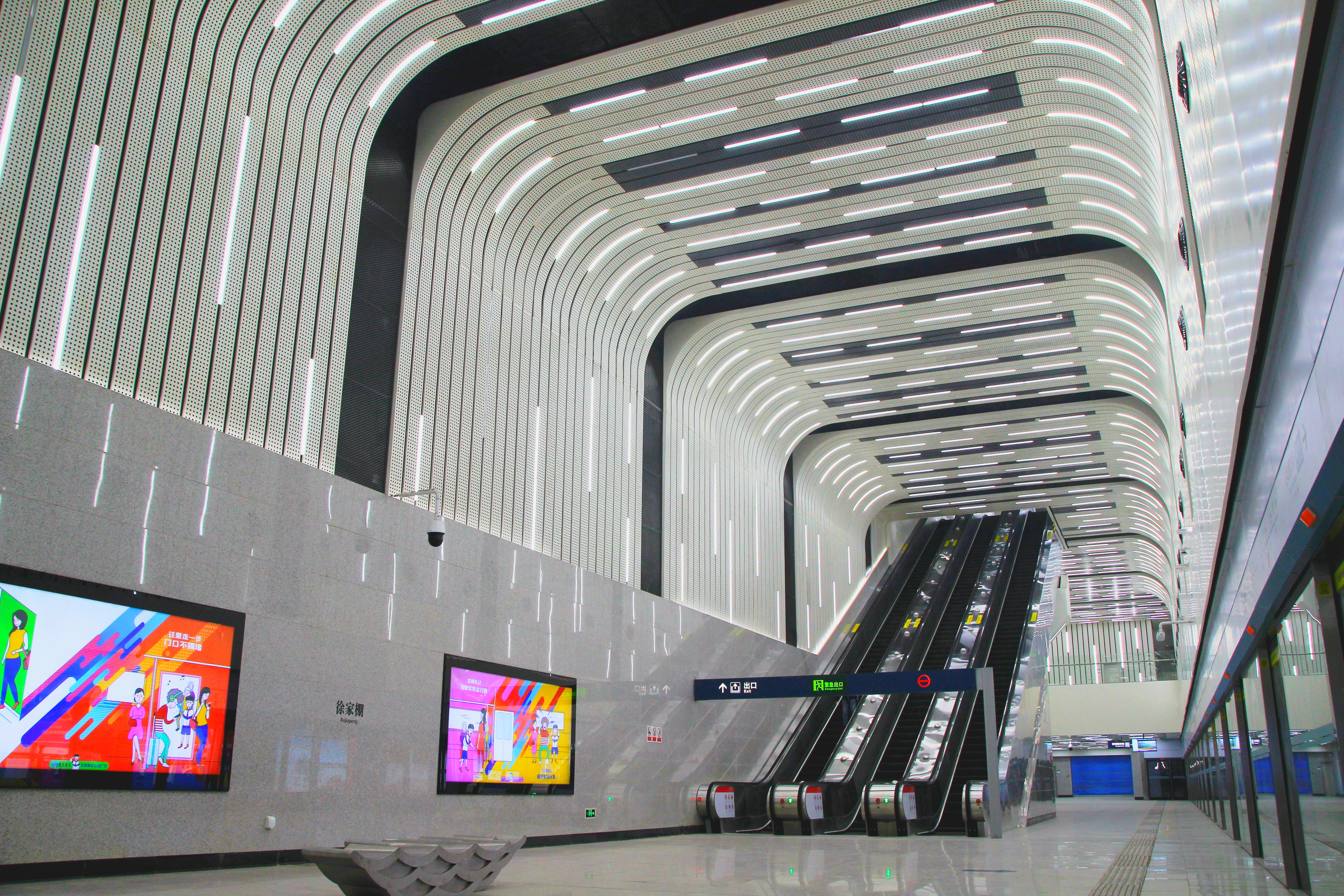
The platform of Xujiapeng Station, Line 8

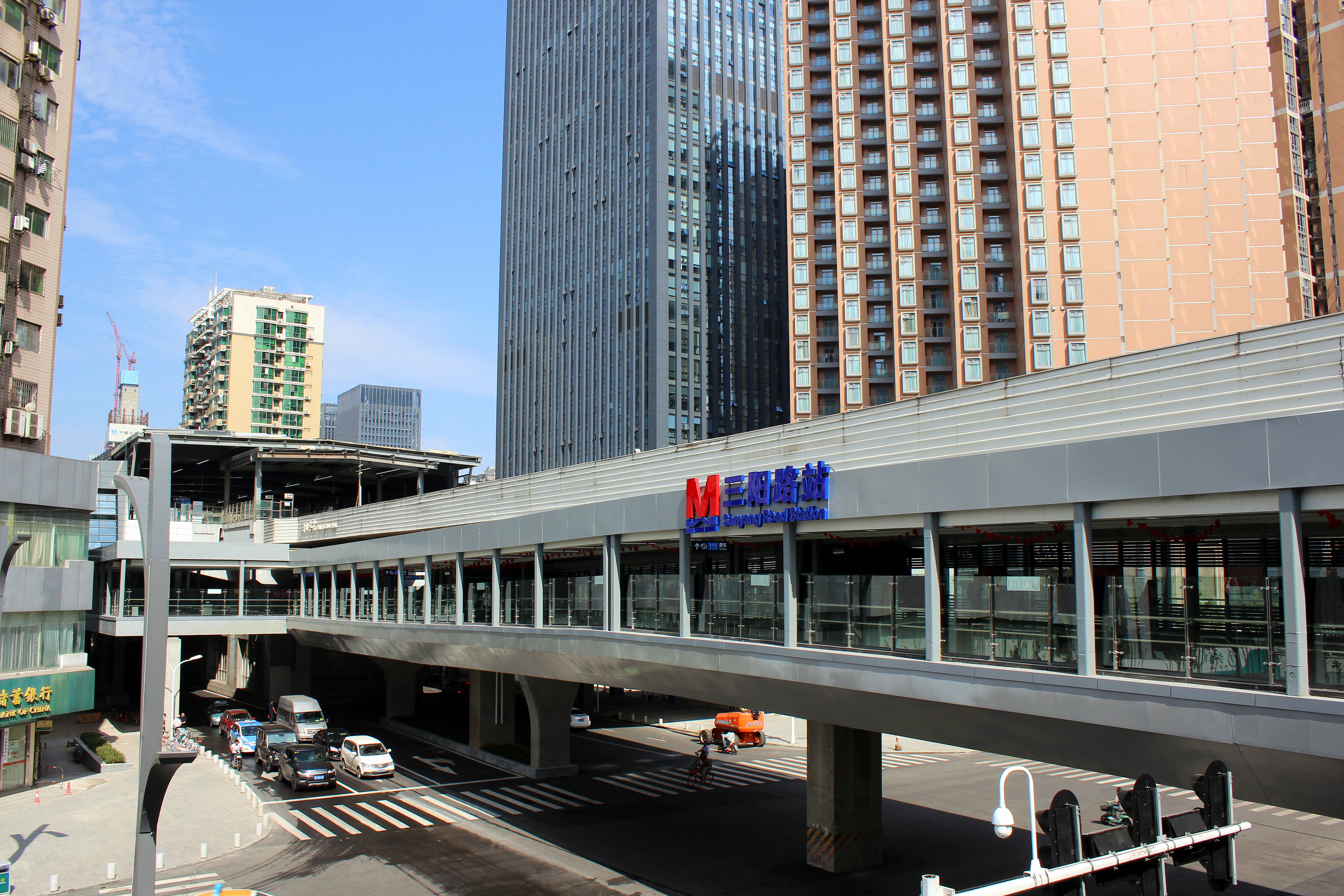
Transfer passage in Sanyang Road Station

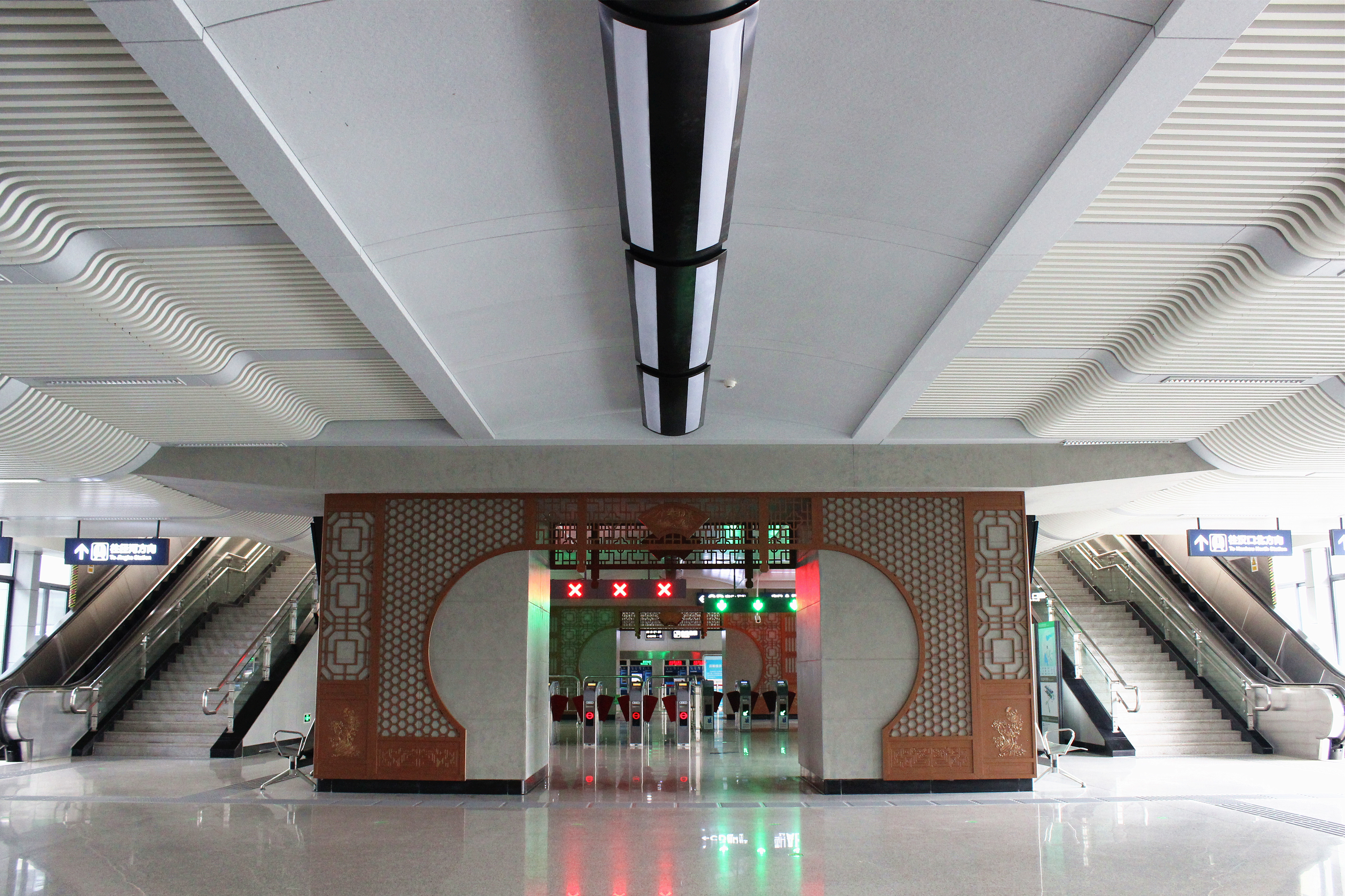
The concourse of Matoutan Park Station

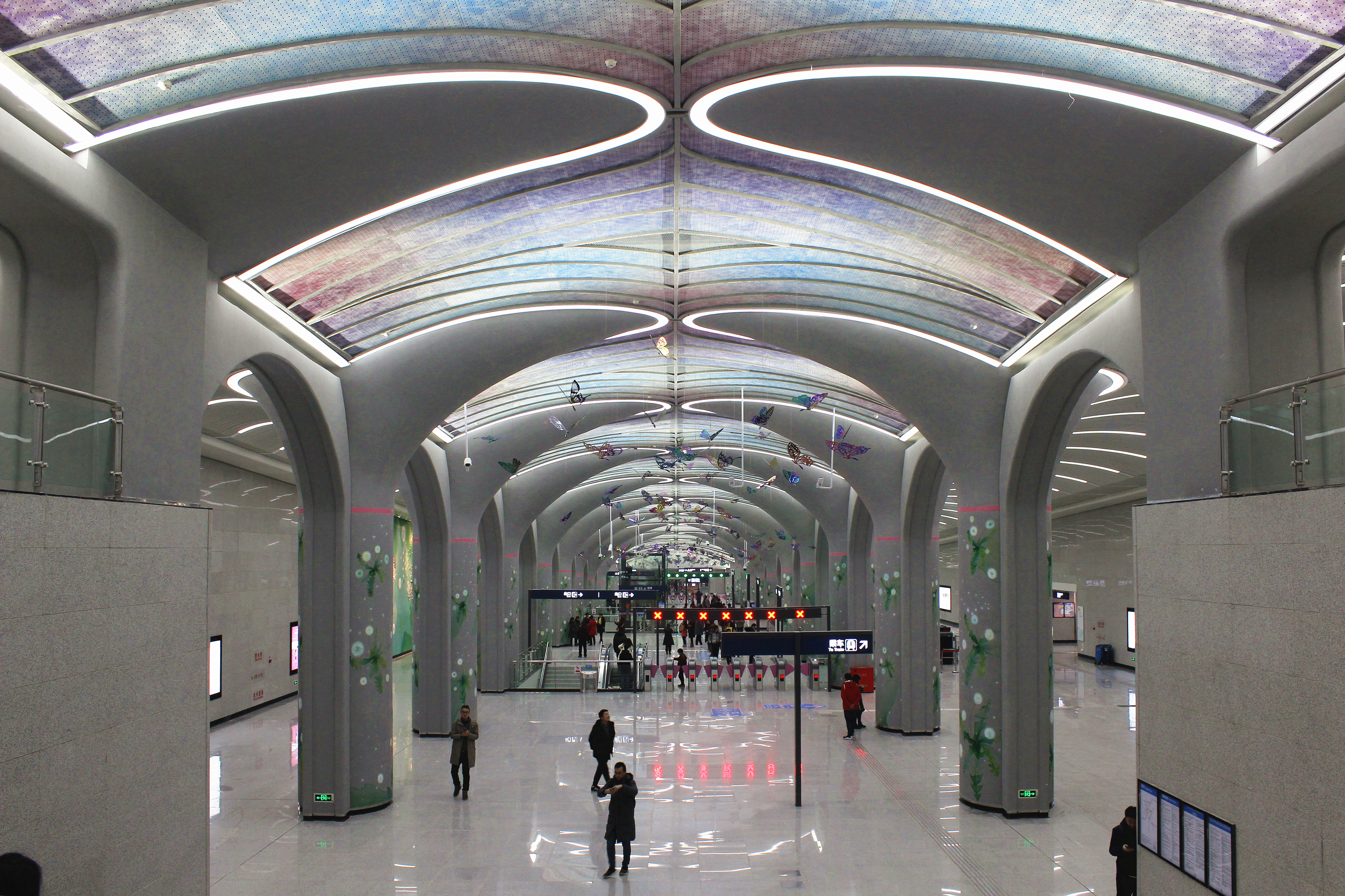
The concourse of Luoxiong Road Station

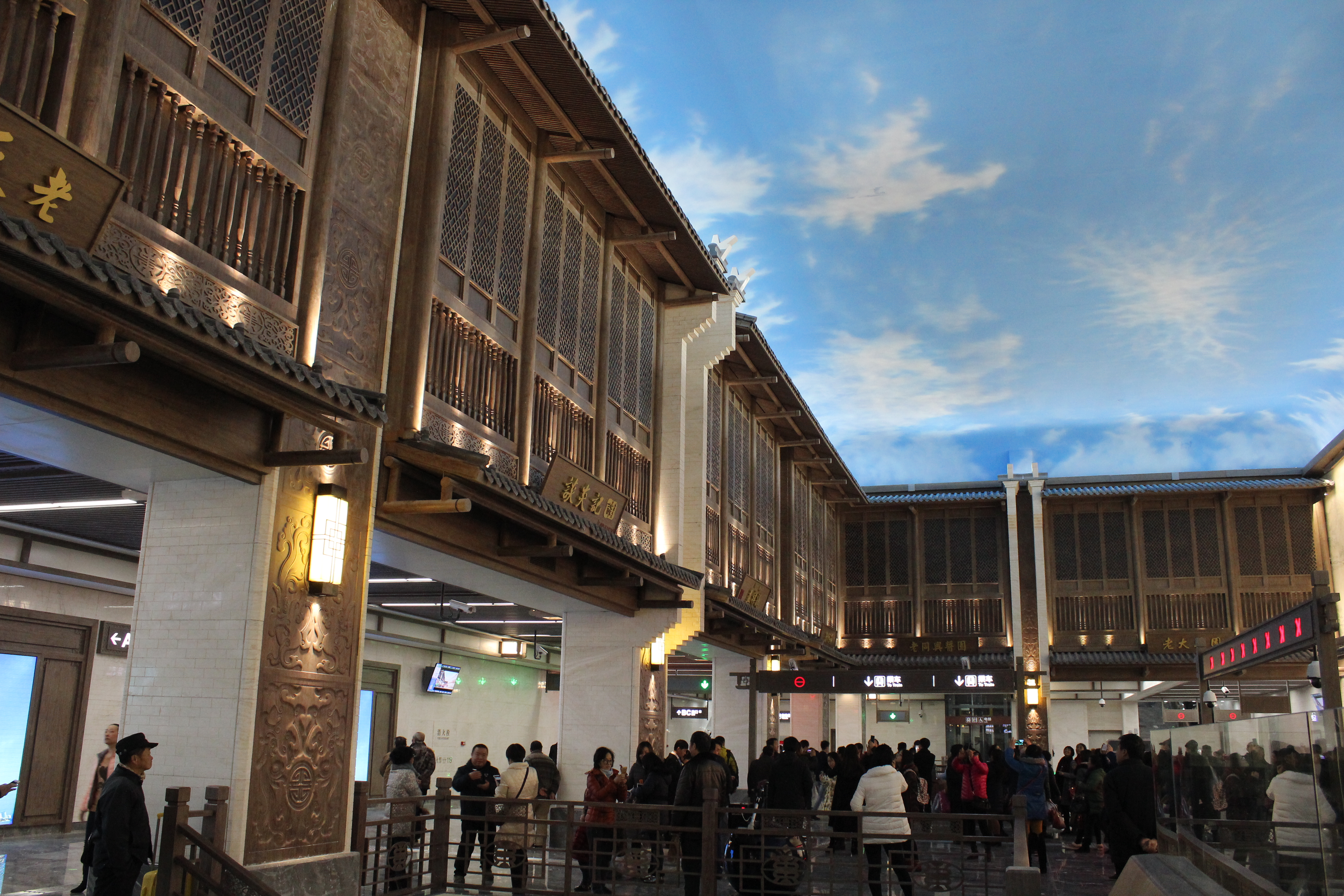
The concourse of Hanzheng Street Station

Continuous cross-platform transfer on Line 2 & 4

== See also ==
- Wuhan Metro rolling stock
- List of Wuhan Metro stations
- Wuhan suspended monorail
- Trams in Wuhan
- Wuhan Metro Museum
- List of metro systems
- Urban rail transit in China
