= Huangjinkou station =

Metro station in Wuhan, China

Huangjinkou 黄金口 metro
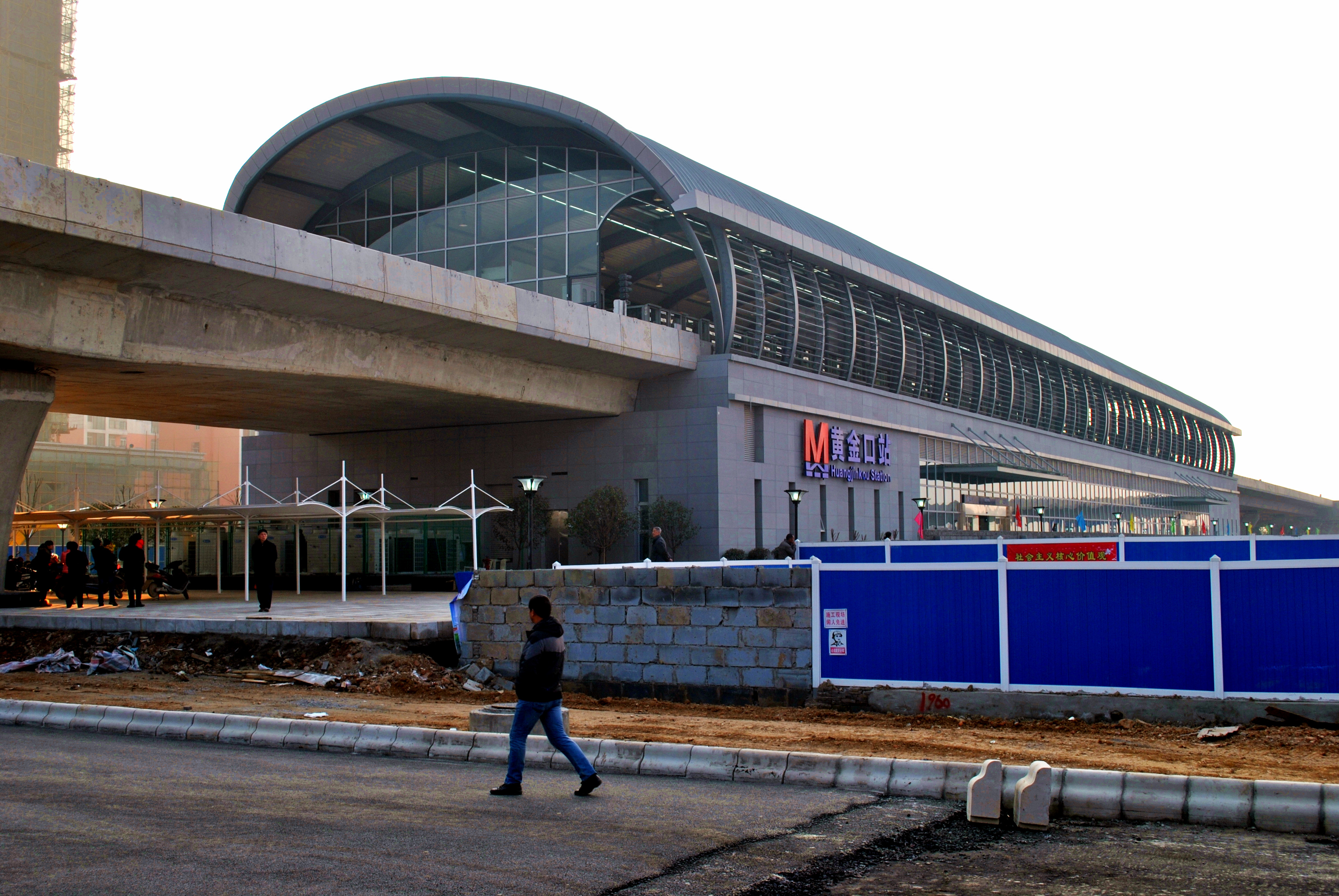

General information
- Location: Hanyang District, Wuhan, Hubei; China
- Coordinates: 30.5664°N 114.1397°E
- Operated by: Wuhan Metro Co., Ltd
- Line: Line 4
- Platforms: 2 (1 island platform)

Construction
- Structure type: Elevated

History
- Opened: December 28, 2014

Services
Preceding station	Wuhan Metro	Following station
Xintian towards Bailin	Line 4	Mengjiapu towards Wuhan Railway Station
Location

Huangjinkou Station (Chinese: 黄金口站) is a station of Line 4 of Wuhan Metro. It entered revenue service on December 28, 2014. It is located in Hanyang District.

== Station layout ==
2F	Westbound	← Line 4 towards Bailin (Xintian)
2F	Island platform, doors will open on the left
2F	Eastbound	Line 4 towards Wuhan Railway Station (Mengjiapu) →
G	Concourse	Faregates, Station Agent

== Gallery ==
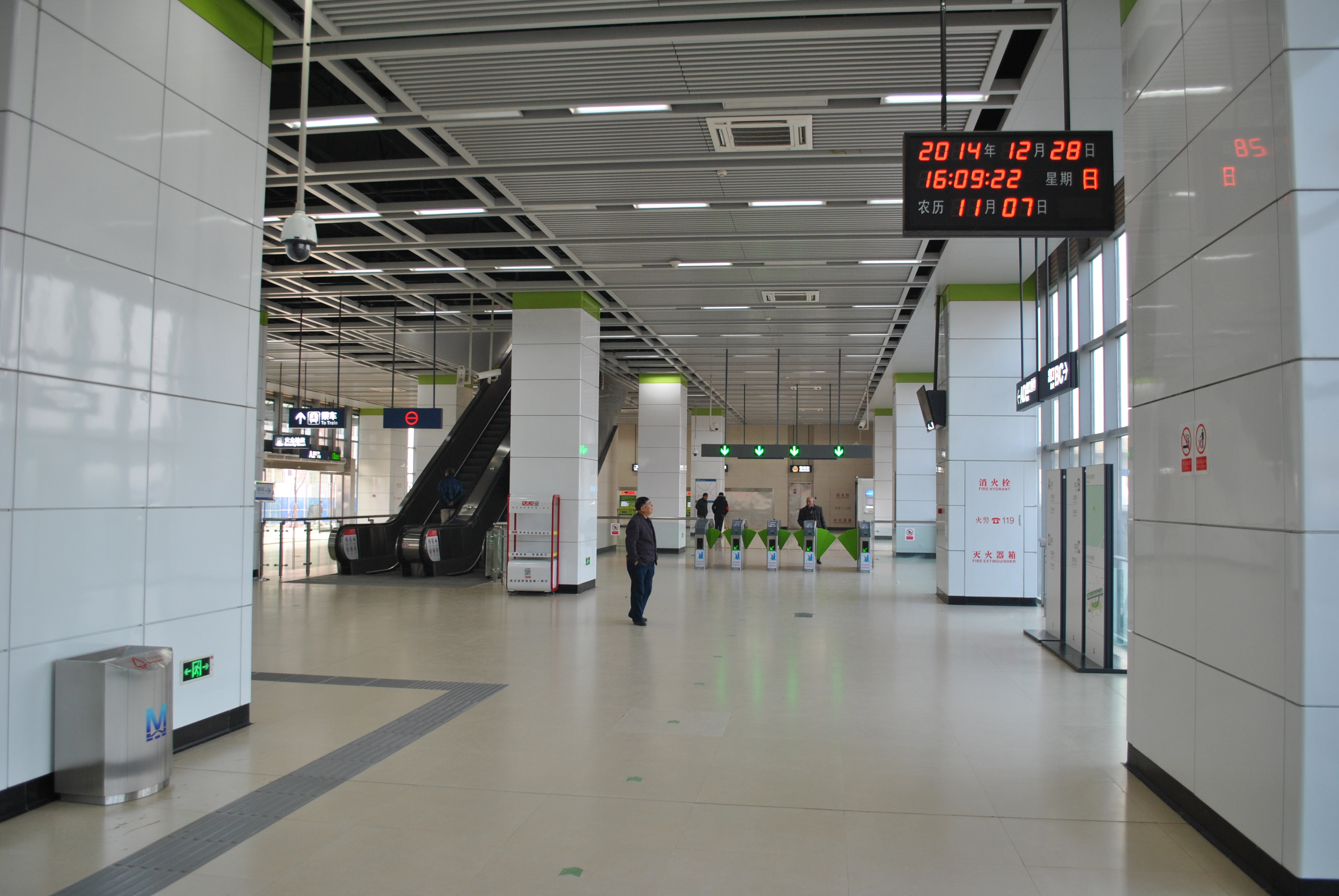
Concourse

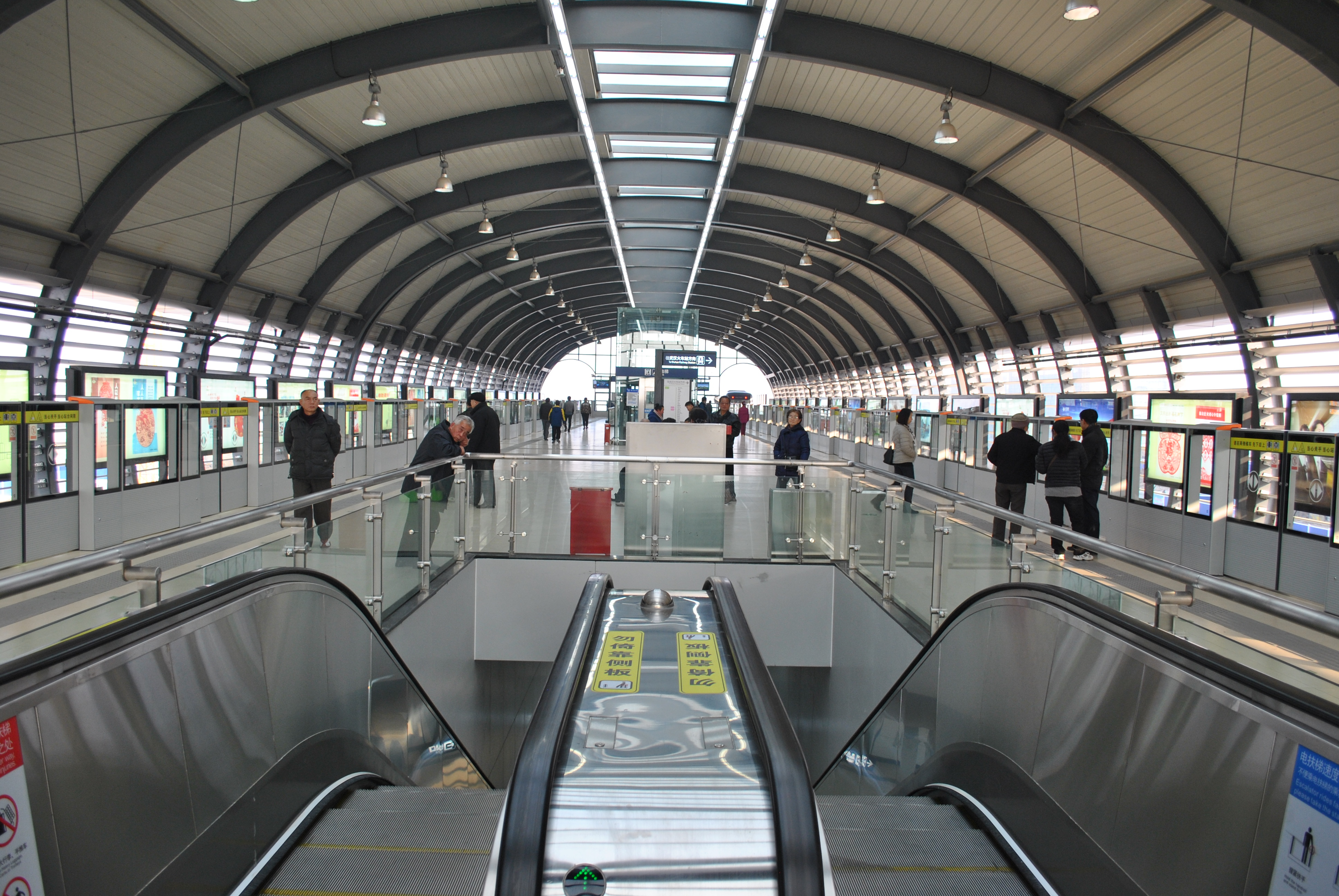
Platform
