= Wangjiawan station (Wuhan Metro) =

Metro station in Wuhan, China

Wangjiawan 王家湾 metro
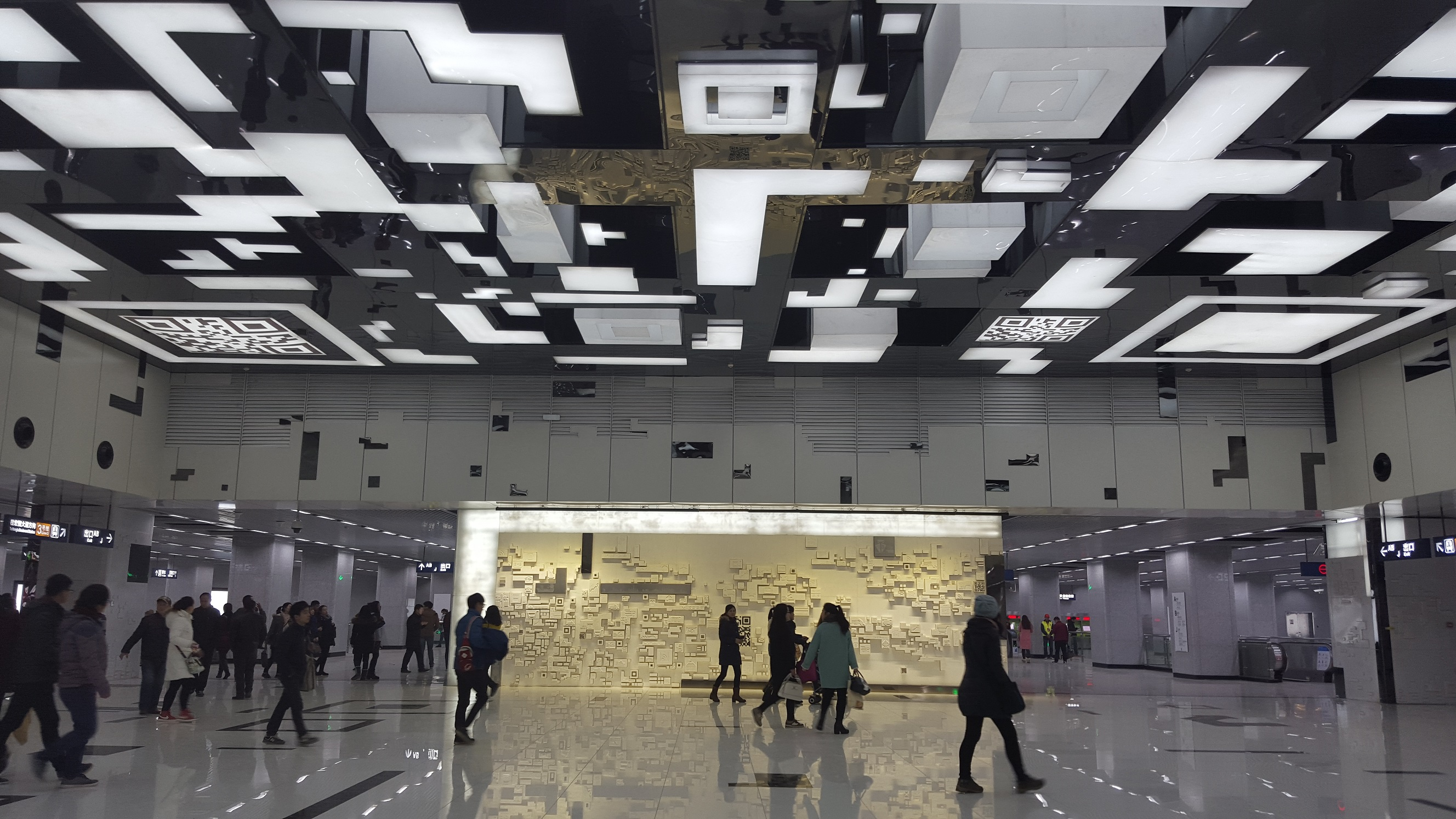

General information
- Location: Hanyang District, Wuhan, Hubei; China
- Operated by: Wuhan Metro Co., Ltd
- Lines: Line 3; Line 4
- Platforms: 4 (1 island platform, 2 side platform)

Construction
- Structure type: Underground

History
- Opened: December 28, 2014 (Line 4); December 28, 2015 (Line 3)

Services
Preceding station	Wuhan Metro	Following station
Zongguan towards Hongtu Boulevard	Line 3	Longyangcun towards Zhuanyang Boulevard
Yulong Road towards Bailin	Line 4	Shilipu towards Wuhan Railway Station
Location

Wangjiawan Station (Chinese: 王家湾站) is a transfer station on Line 3 and Line 4 of the Wuhan Metro. It entered revenue service on December 28, 2014. It is in Hanyang District.

== Station layout ==
G	Entrances and Exits	Exits A-H, J-M
B1	Concourse	Faregates, Station Agent
B2		Transfer Corridor
B2	Side platform, doors will open on the right
B2	Northbound	← Line 3 towards Hongtu Boulevard (Zongguan)
B2	Southbound	Line 3 towards Zhuanyang Boulevard (Longyangcun) →
B2	Side platform, doors will open on the right
B2		Transfer Corridor
B3	Westbound	← Line 4 towards Bailin (Yulong Road)
B3	Island platform, doors will open on the left
B3	Eastbound	Line 4 towards Wuhan Railway Station (Shilipu) →

== Gallery ==
=== Station ===
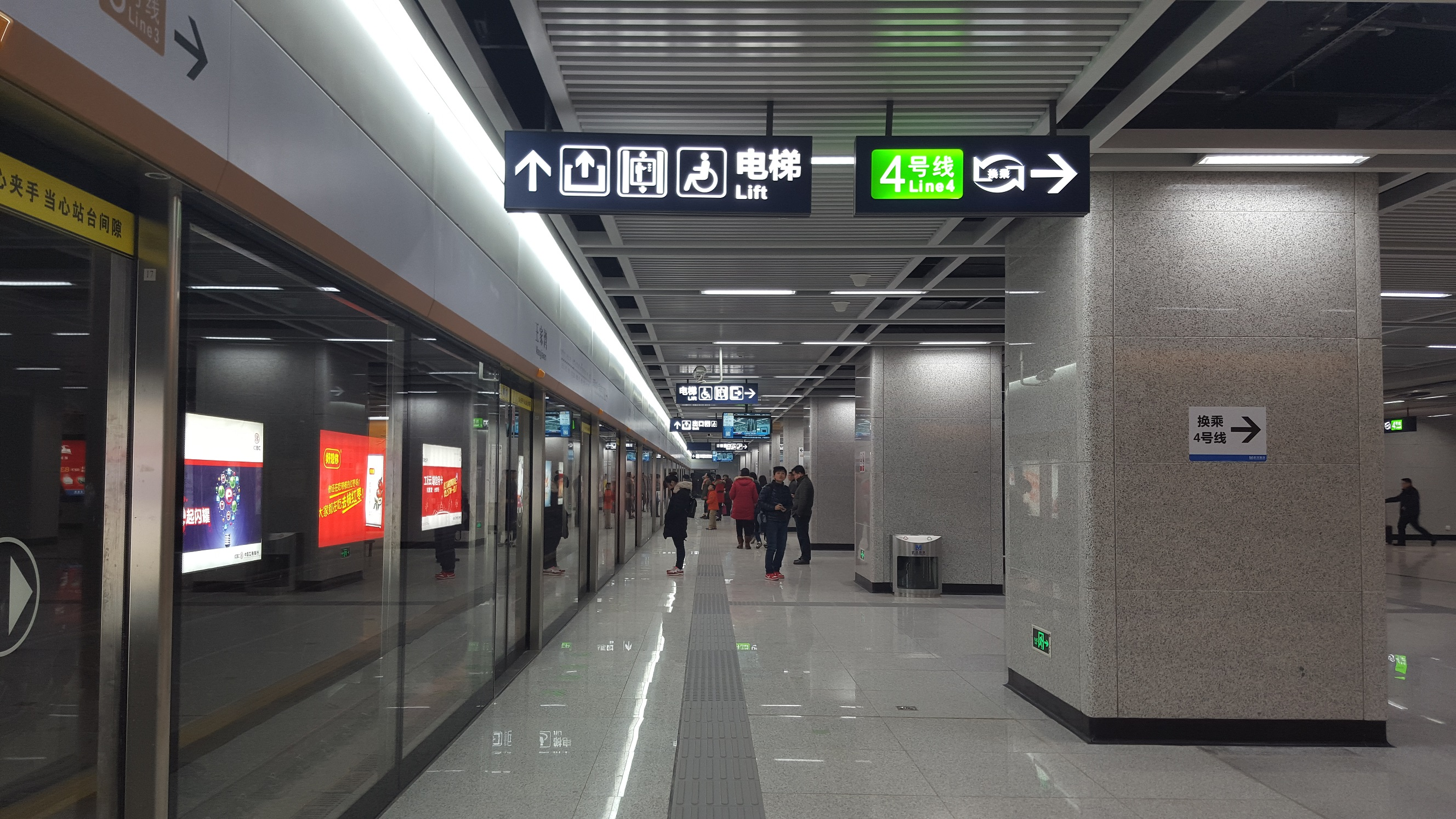
Platform of Line 3

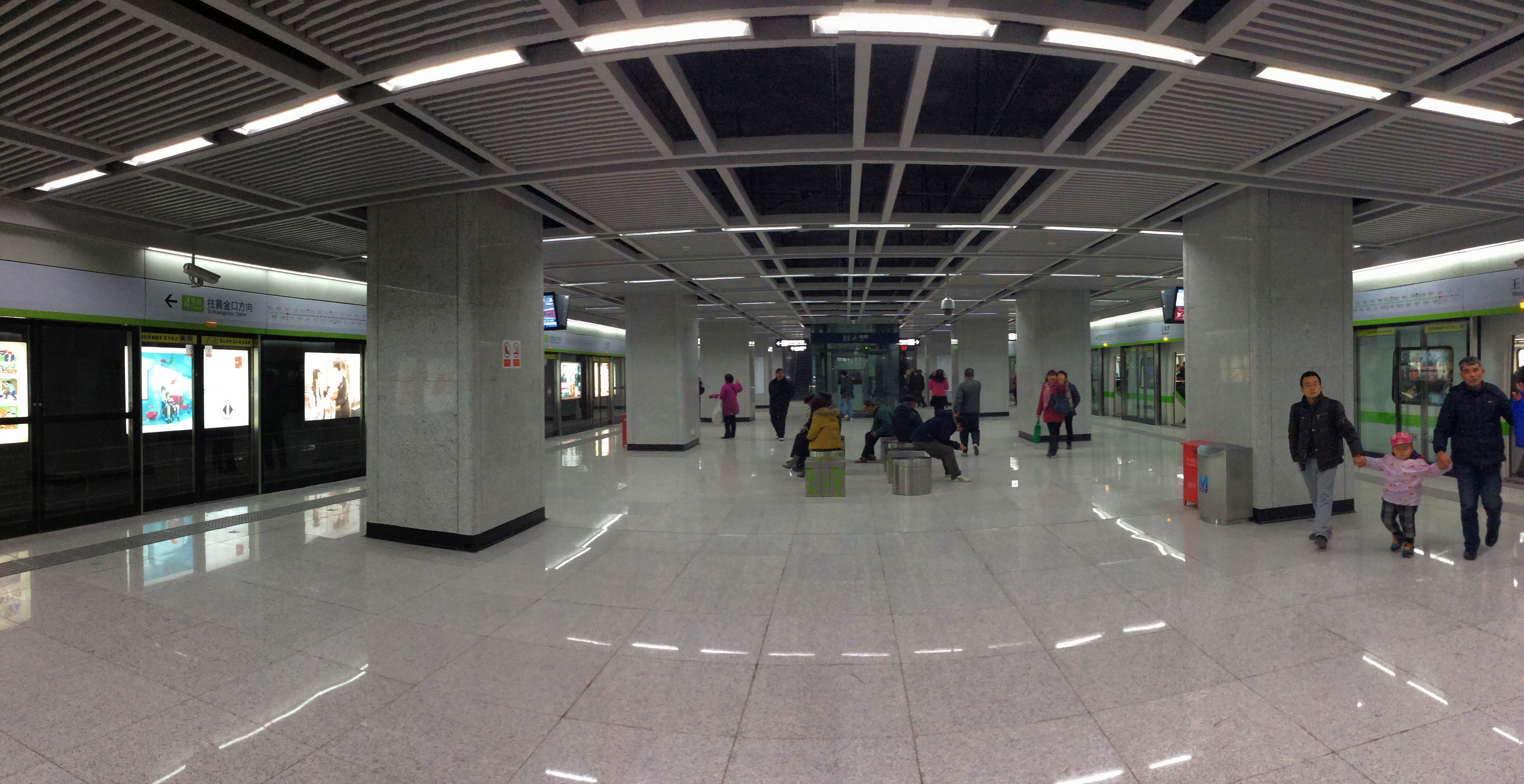
Platform of Line 4

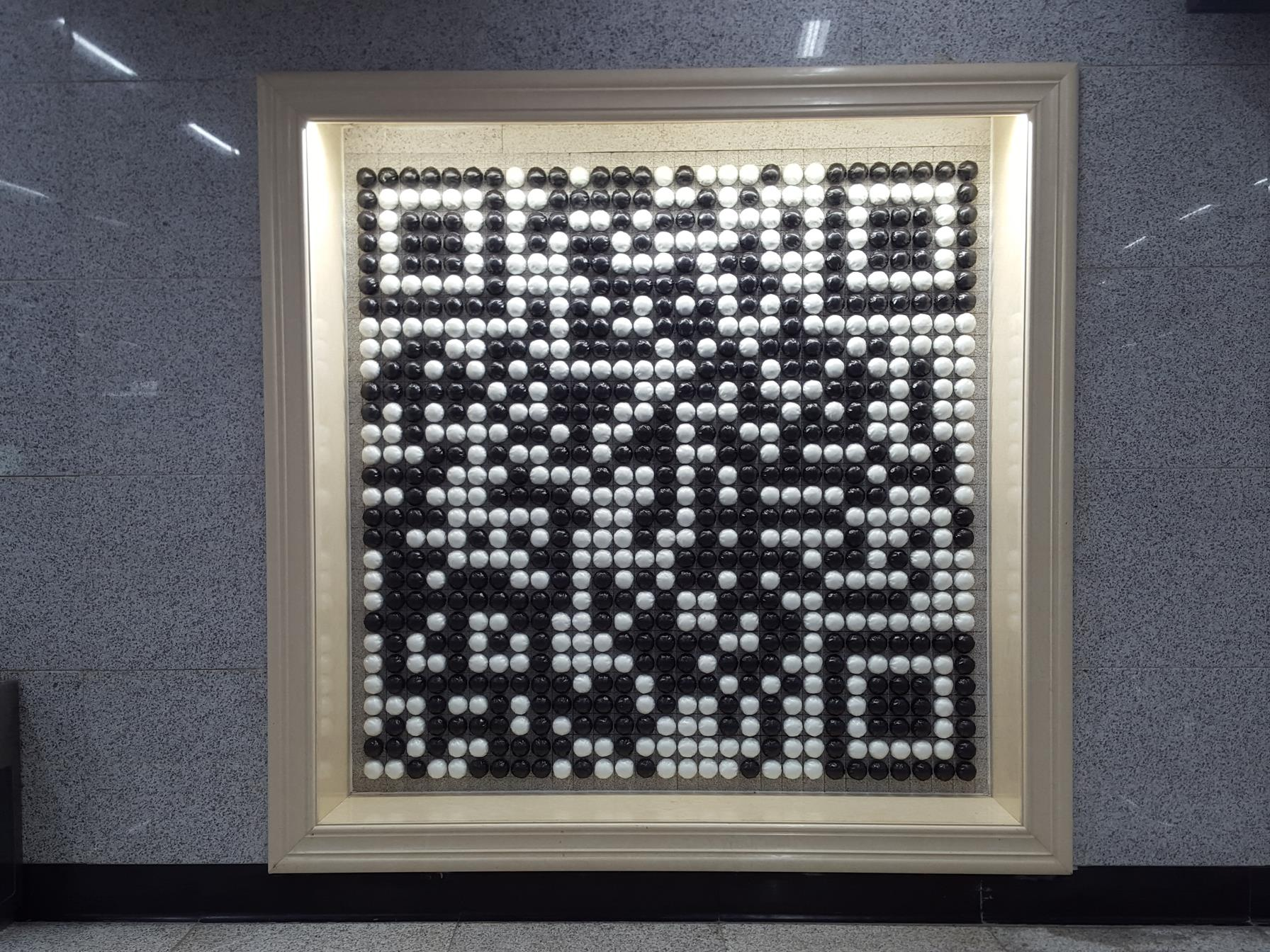
Art Wall

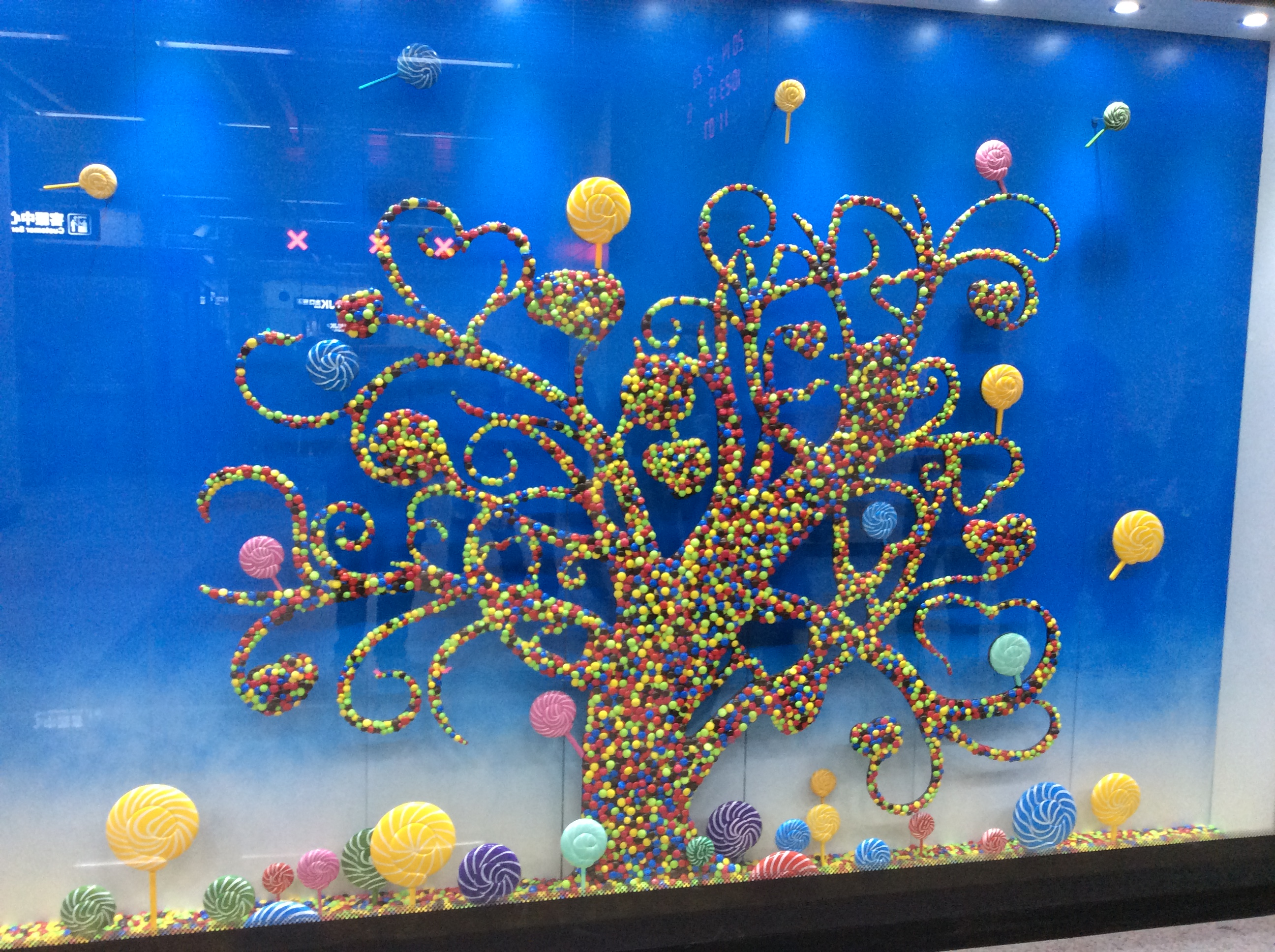
Art Wall

=== Extrance ===
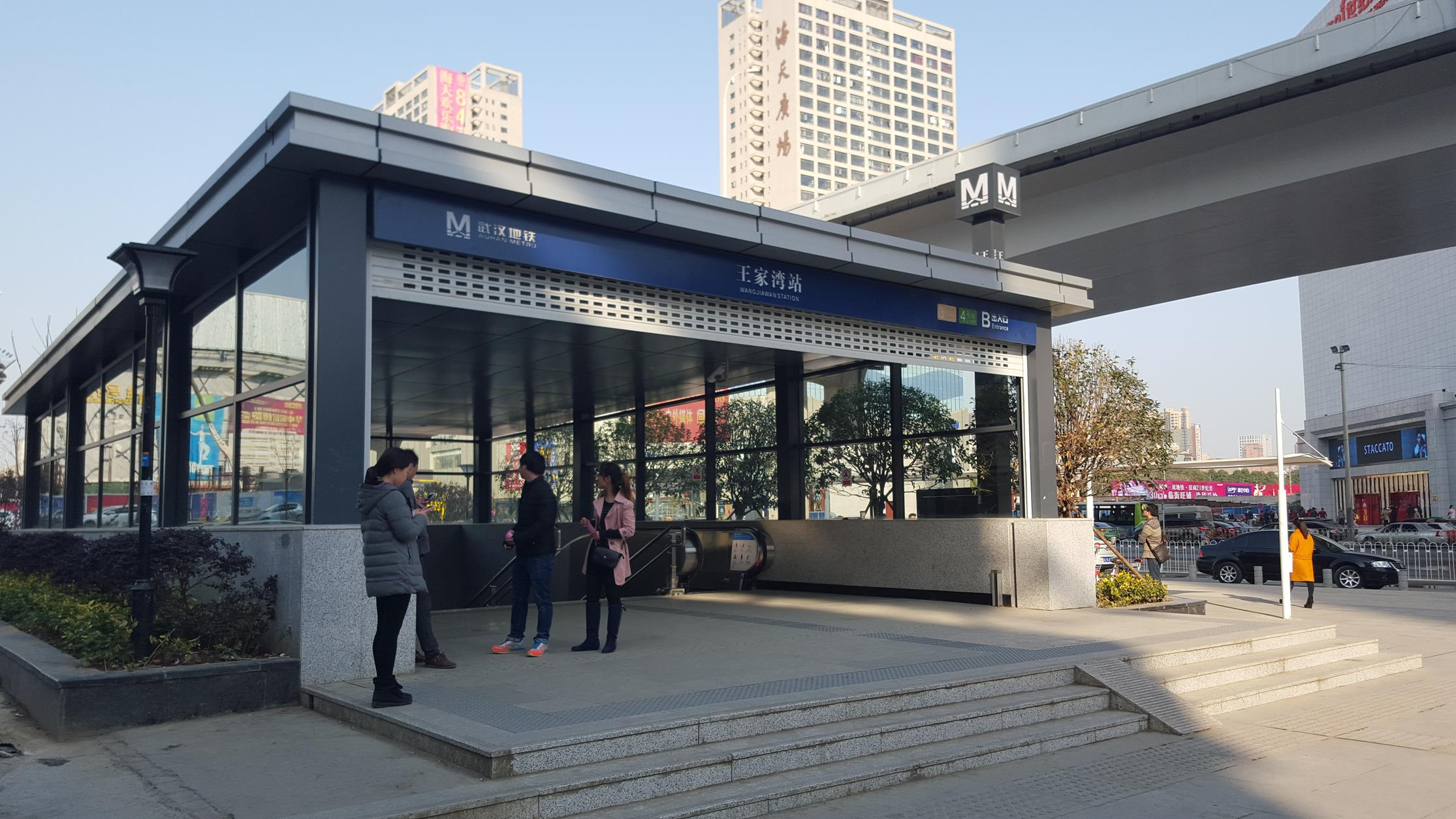
Entrance B

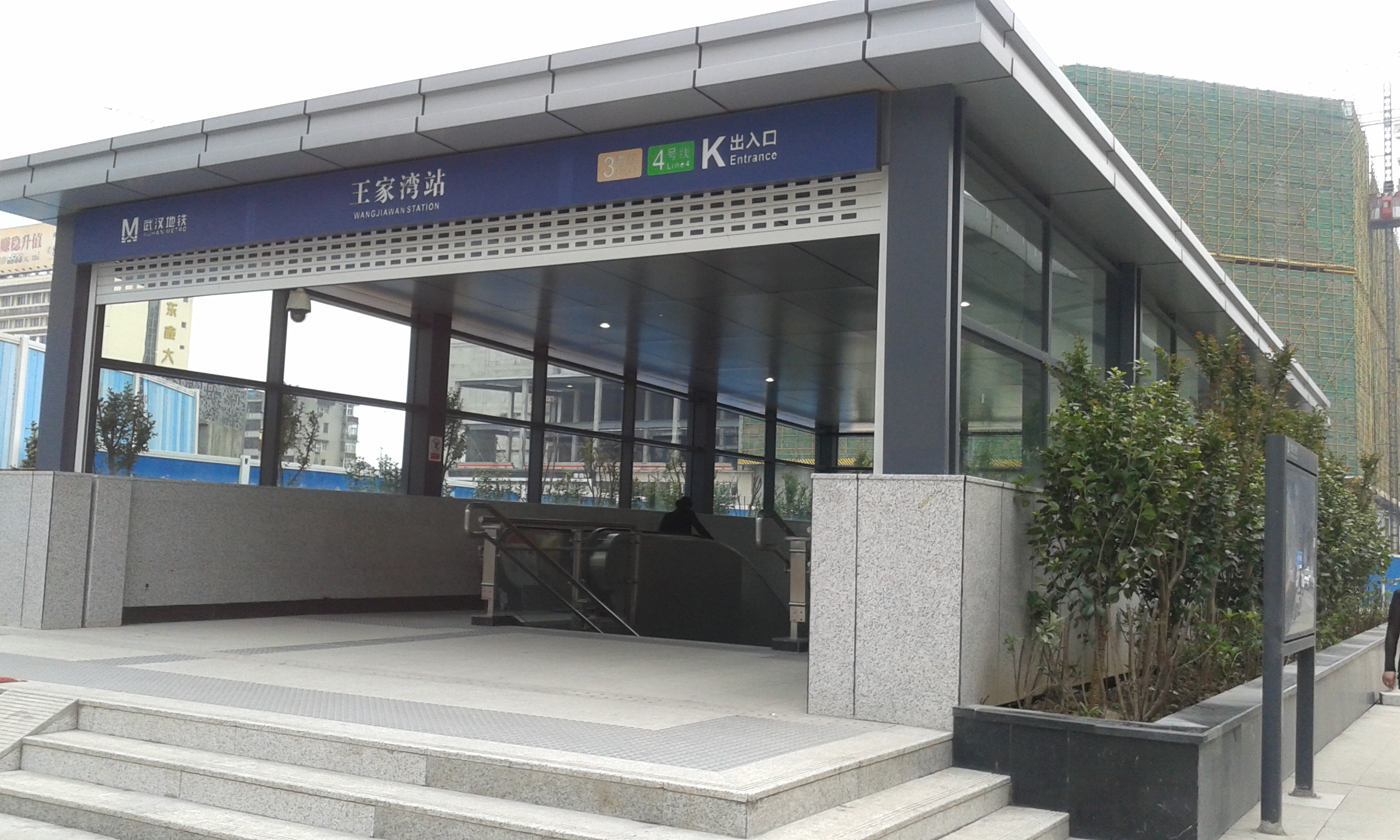
Entrance K

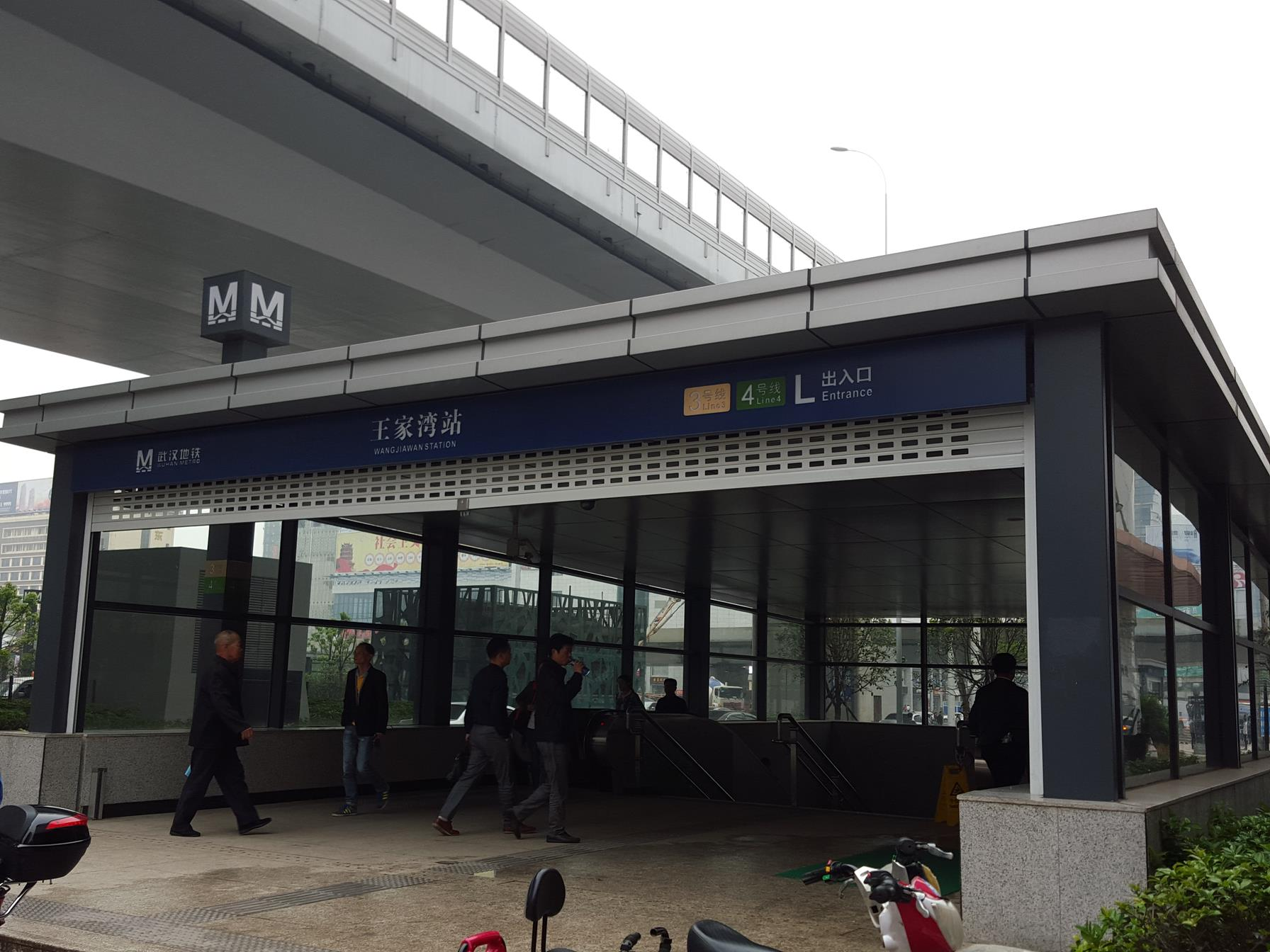
Entrance L

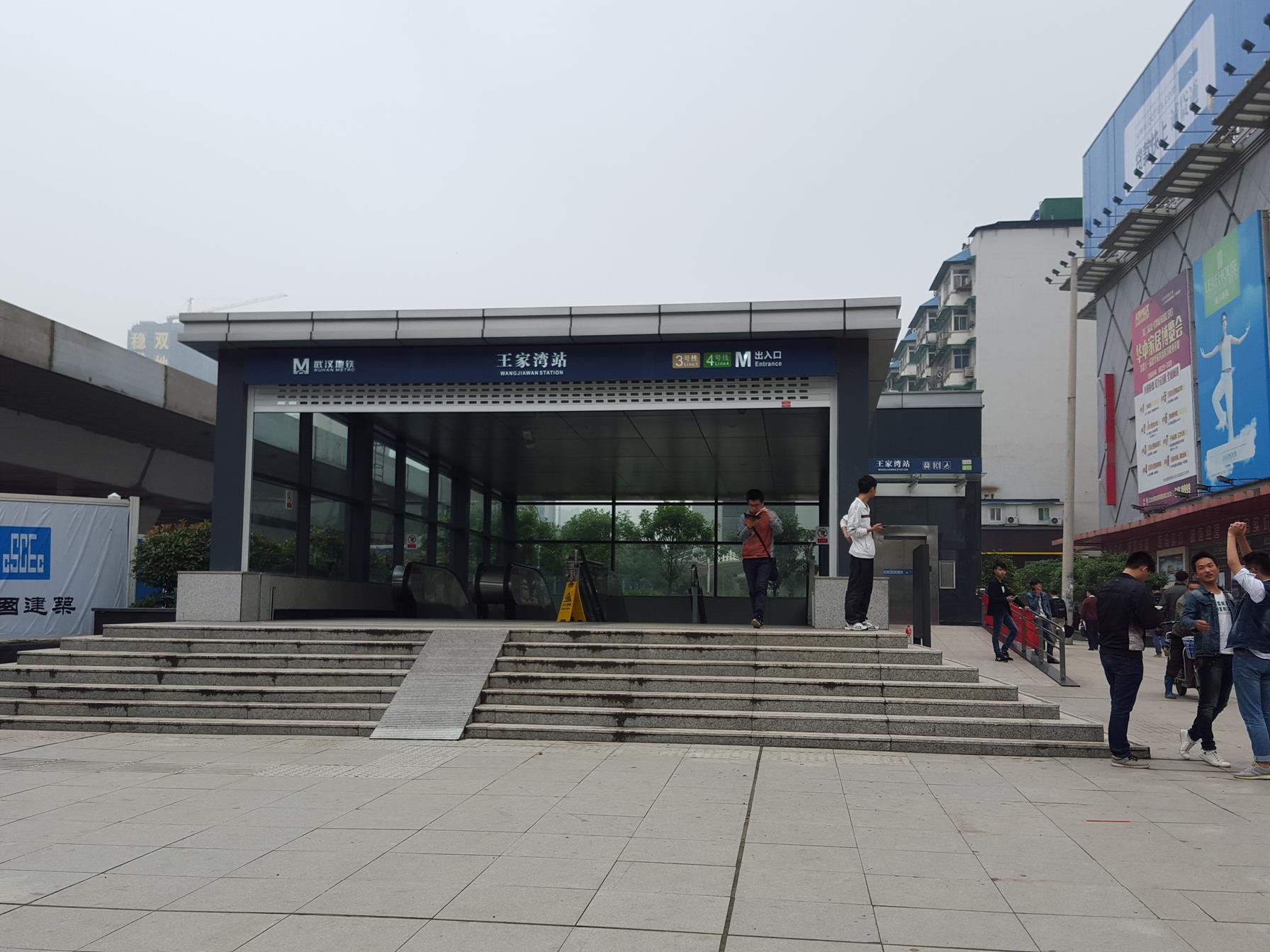
Elevator at Entrance M
