= Shilipu station =

Shilipu Station may refer to:

- Shilipu station (Beijing Subway) (十里堡), a station on the Beijing Subway in Beijing.
- Shilipu station (Wuhan Metro) (十里铺), a station on the Wuhan Metro in Wuhan, Hubei.
