= Yuanlin Road station =

Metro station in Wuhan, China

Yuanlin Road 园林路 metro
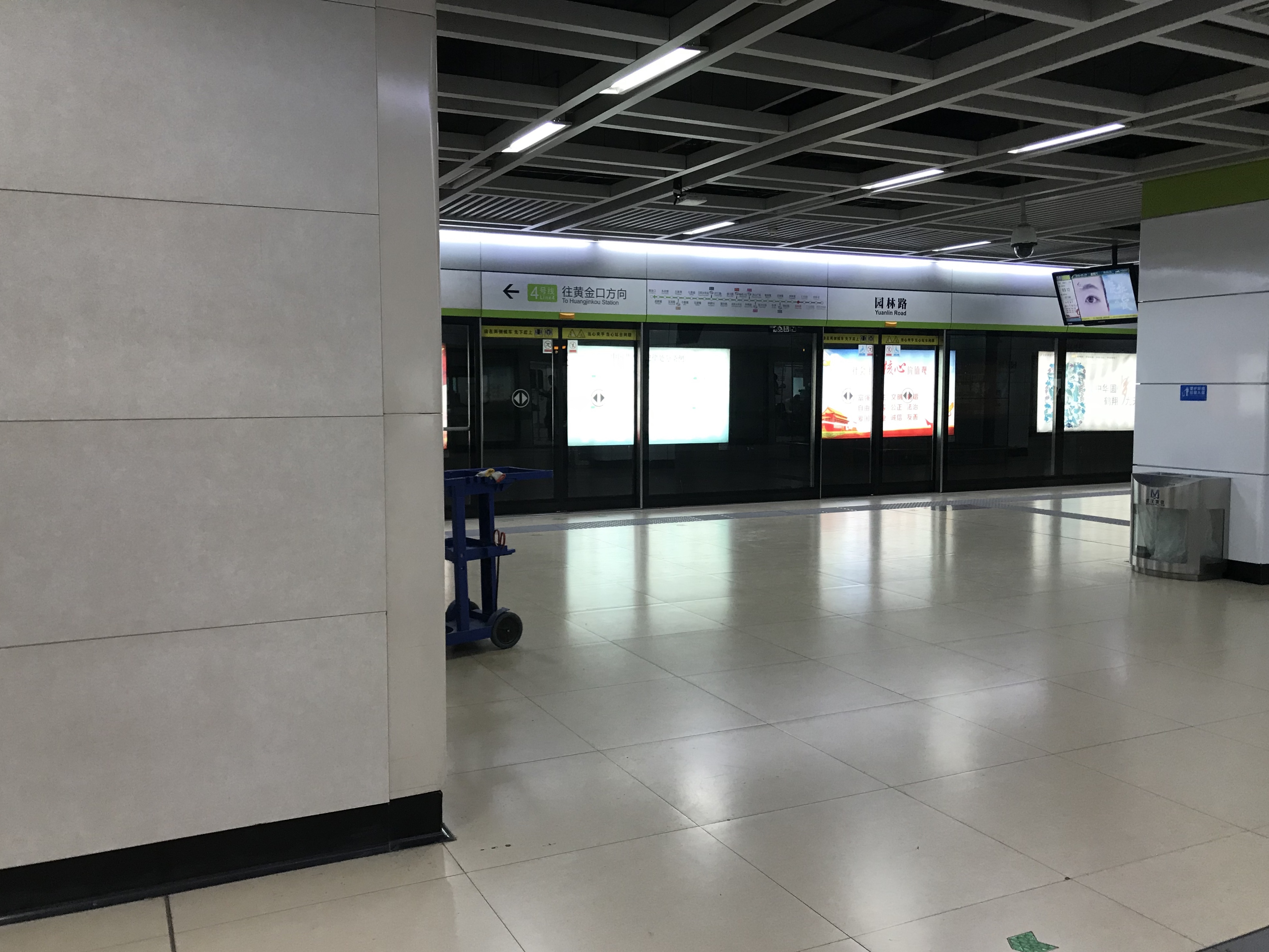

General information
- Location: Tuanjie Boulevard (团结大道) × Yuanlin Road; Hongshan District, Wuhan, Hubei; China
- Coordinates: 30°36′9.79″N 114°22′23.12″E
- Operator: Wuhan Metro Co., Ltd
- Lines: Line 4 Line 12
- Platforms: 4 (2 island platforms)

Construction
- Structure type: Underground

History
- Opened: December 28, 2013 (Line 4); May 1, 2026 (Line 12)

Services
Preceding station	Wuhan Metro	Following station
Luojiagang towards Bailin	Line 4	Renhe Road towards Wuhan Railway Station
Gangduhuayuan Outer Circle	Line 12	Tuanjie Boulevard Inner Circle
Location

Yuanlin Road Station (Chinese: 园林路站) is a station of Line 4 and Line 12 of Wuhan Metro. It entered revenue service on December 28, 2013. It is located in Hongshan District.

== Station layout ==
G	Entrances and Exits	Exits A-H, J, K, L, N, Q
B1	Concourse	Faregates, Station Agent
B2	Westbound	← Line 4 towards Bailin (Luojiagang)
B2	Island platform, doors will open on the left
B2	Eastbound	Line 4 towards Wuhan Railway Station (Renhe Road) →
B3	Outer Circle	← Line 12 Outer Circle (Gangduhuayuan)
B3	Island platform, doors will open on the left
B3	Inner Circle	Line 12 Inner Circle (Tuanjie Boulevard) →
