= Qilimiao station =

Metro station in Wuhan, China

Qilimiao 七里庙

General information
- Location: Hanyang District, Wuhan, Hubei; China
- Coordinates: 30.55893°N 114.22673°E
- Operated by: Wuhan Metro Co., Ltd
- Line: Line 4
- Platforms: 2 (1 island platform)

Construction
- Structure type: Underground

History
- Opened: December 28, 2014

Services
Preceding station	Wuhan Metro	Following station
Shilipu towards Bailin	Line 4	Wulidun towards Wuhan Railway Station
Location

Qilimiao Station (Chinese: 七里庙站) is a station of Line 4 of Wuhan Metro. It entered revenue service on December 28, 2014. It is located in Hanyang District.

== Station layout ==
G	Entrances and Exits
B1	Concourse	Faregates, Station Agent
B2	Westbound	← Line 4 towards Bailin (Shilipu)
B2	Island platform, doors will open on the left
B2	Eastbound	Line 4 towards Wuhan Railway Station (Wulidun) →
