= Mengjiapu station =

Metro station in Wuhan, China

Mengjiapu 孟家铺
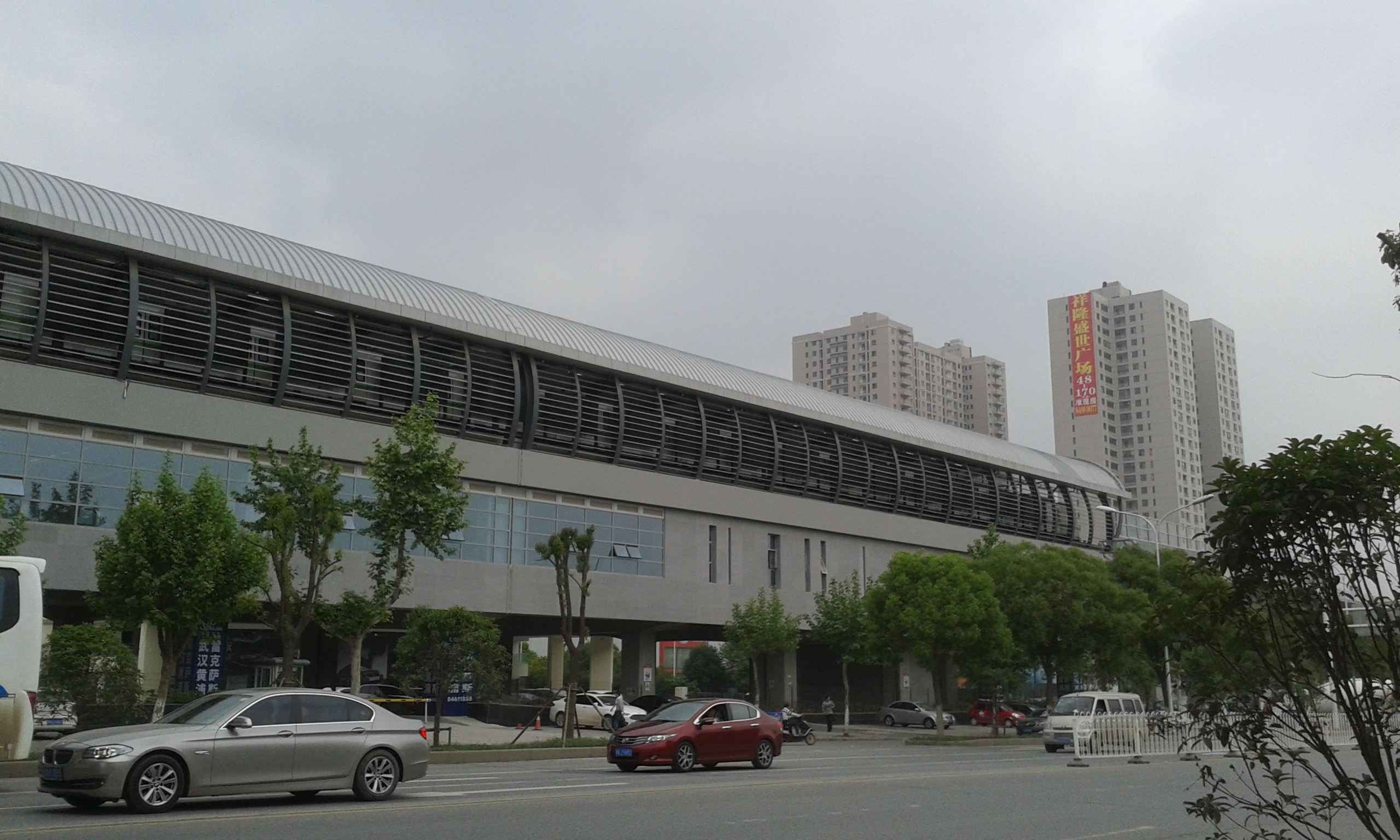

General information
- Location: Hanyang District, Wuhan, Hubei; China
- Operated by: Wuhan Metro Co., Ltd
- Line: Line 4
- Platforms: 2 (1 island platform)

Construction
- Structure type: Elevated

History
- Opened: December 28, 2014

Services
Preceding station	Wuhan Metro	Following station
Huangjinkou towards Bailin	Line 4	Yong'antang towards Wuhan Railway Station
Location

Mengjiapu Station (Chinese: 孟家铺站) is a station of Line 4 of Wuhan Metro. It entered revenue service on December 28, 2014. It is located in Hanyang District.

== Station layout ==
3F	Westbound	← Line 4 towards Bailin (Huangjinkou)
3F	Island platform, doors will open on the left
3F	Eastbound	Line 4 towards Wuhan Railway Station (Yong'antang) →
2F	Concourse	Faregates, Station Agent
G	Entrances and Exits

== Gallery ==
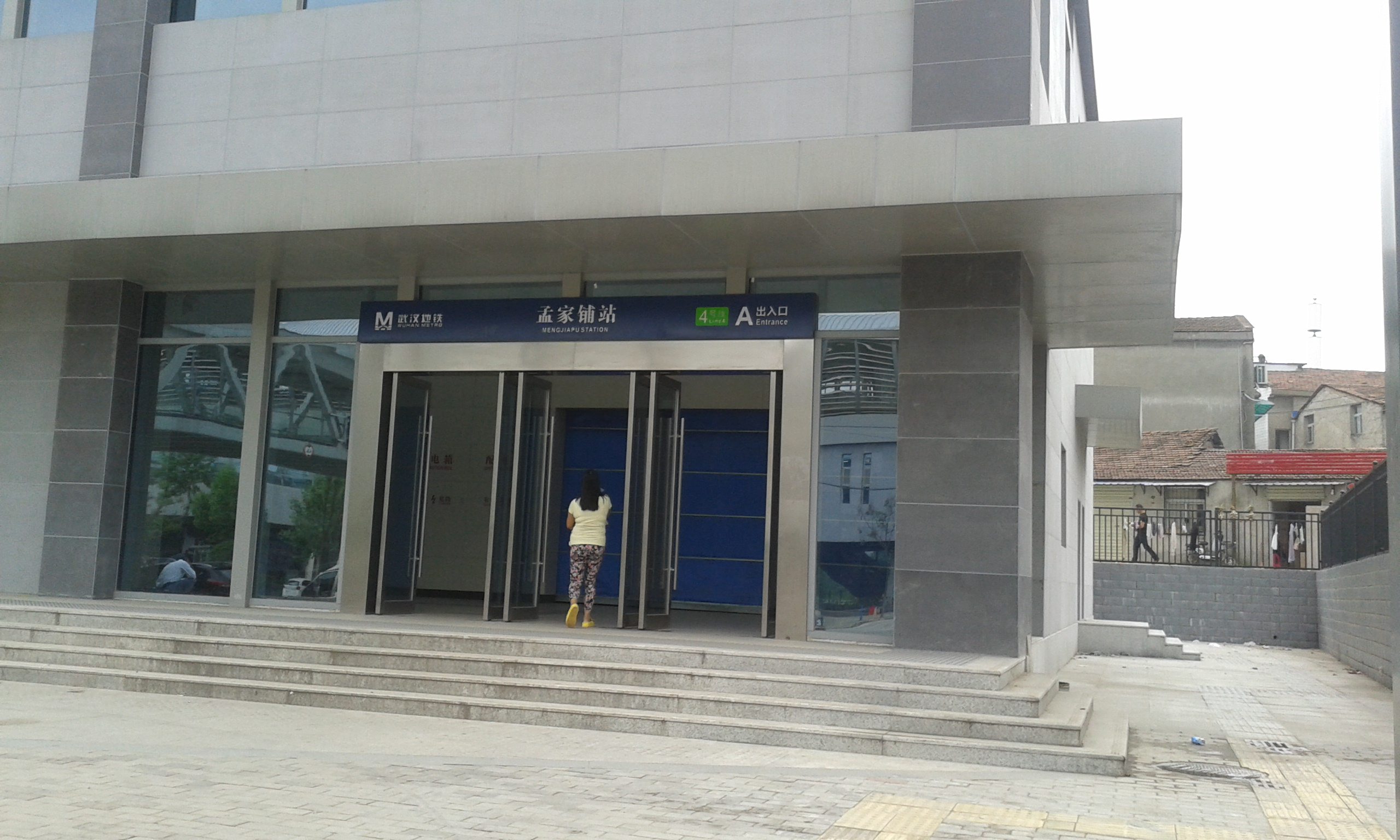
Entrance A

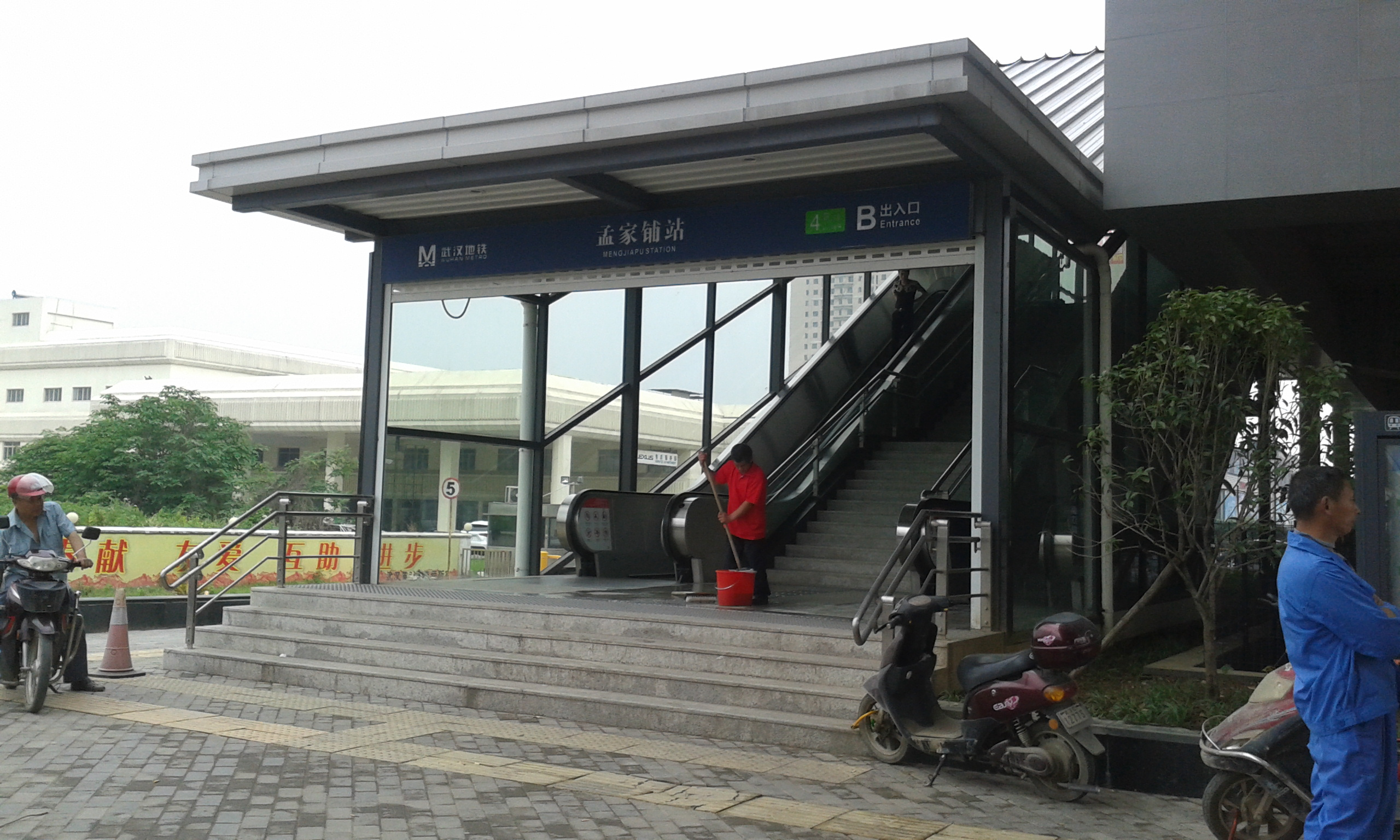
Entrance B
