= Zhiyin station =

Metro station in Wuhan, China

Zhiyin 知音 metro
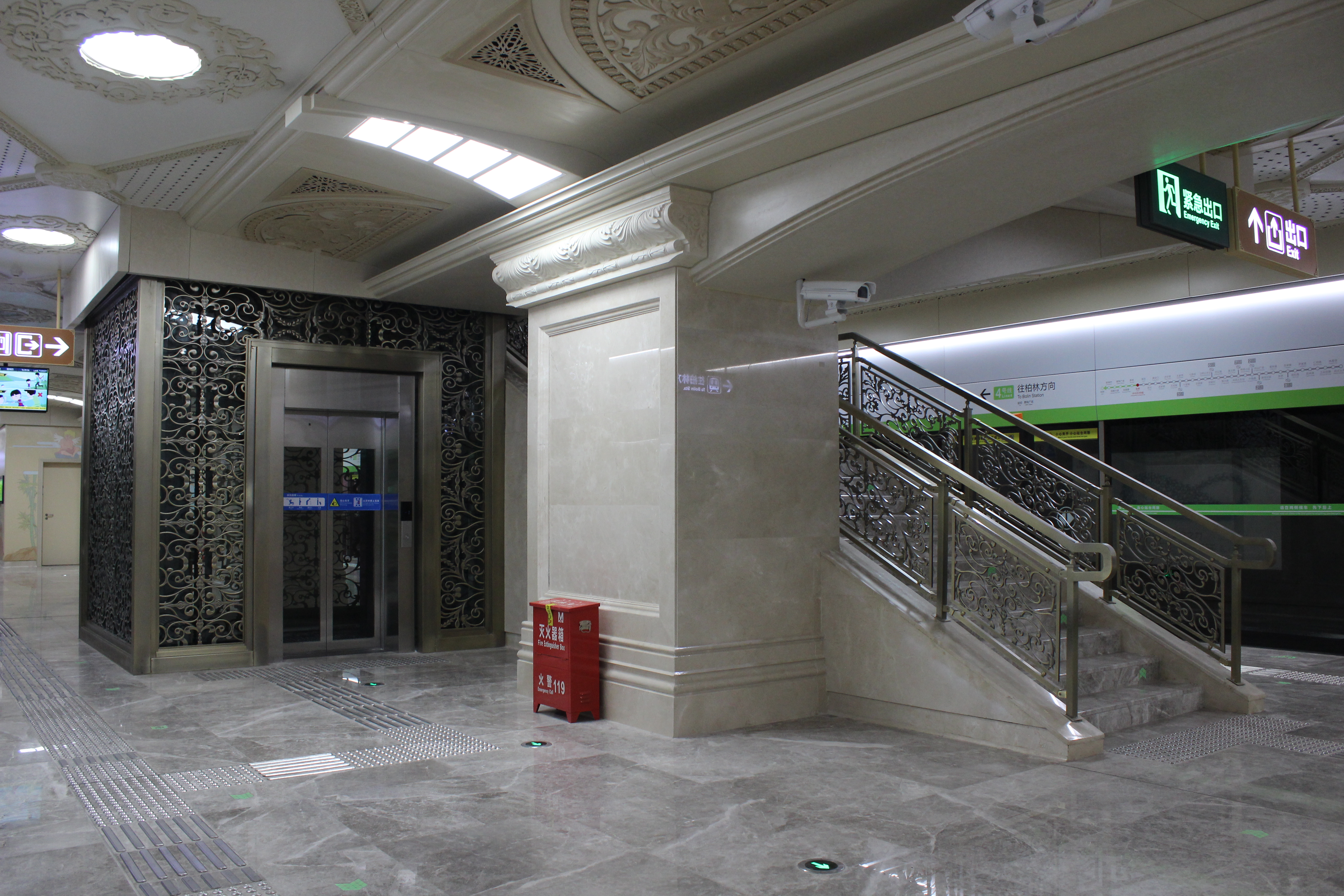

General information
- Location: Caidian District, Wuhan, Hubei; China
- Coordinates: 30.55912°N 114.087367°E
- Operated by: Wuhan Metro Co., Ltd
- Line: Line 4
- Platforms: 2 (1 island platform)

Construction
- Structure type: Underground

History
- Opened: September 25, 2019 (Line 4)

Services
Preceding station	Wuhan Metro	Following station
Xinnong towards Bailin	Line 4	Jixian towards Wuhan Railway Station
Location

Zhiyin Station (Chinese: 知音站) is a station of Line 4 of Wuhan Metro. It entered revenue service on September 25, 2019. It is located in Caidian District.

== Station layout ==
G	Entrances and Exits
B1	Concourse	Faregates, Station Agent
B2	Westbound	← Line 4 towards Bailin (Xinnong)
B2	Island platform, doors will open on the left
B2	Eastbound	Line 4 towards Wuhan Railway Station (Jixian) →
