= Line 12 (Wuhan Metro) =

Metro line in Wuhan, Hubei

Overview
- Status: In operation
- Owner: Wuhan Metro
- Locale: Wuhan, Hubei, China
- Stations: 37

Service
- Type: Rapid transit
- System: Wuhan Metro
- Operator: Wuhan Metro Line 12 Construction and Operation Co
- Depot: Banqiao Parking lot

History
- Opened: 1 May 2026; 6 months ago (Phase 1); 29 October 2026; 5 days ago (Phase 2)

Technical
- Line length: 59.9 km (37.2 mi) (In operation)
- Num of tracks: 2
- Character: Underground
- Track gauge: 1,435 mm (4 ft 8 1/2 in)
- Electrification: 1,500 V DC Third rail
- Operating speed: 80 km/h (50 mph) (Maximum design speed)
Route map

Line 12 of the Wuhan Metro (Chinese: 武汉地铁12号线) is a rapid transit loop line in Wuhan, Hubei, China. The first phase has total length of 35.32 km (21.95 mi) with 23 stations in operation. Line 12 has purchased a total of 79 trains. In the first phase, 43 trains with GoA4 automation level will be put into operation. Line 12 is the second subway line in Central China using fully automated metro line with GoA4 automation level.

Line 12 began construction in 2017. Construction was started on 24 January 2025 and comprises one depot and two parking lots with a total investment of about 80 billion RMB. The first 24 set of rolling stock arrived on 28 September 2025. The first phase of Line 12 was officially put into operation on 1 May 2026 at 9:16 am. The second phase was officially put into operation on 29 October 2026.

Line 12 is the longest loop subway line in the world. (Note: Line 11 of Moscow Metro is 57.5 km in length after its branch closed in June 2024. The Line 11 branch has since reopened as part of Line 17 of Moscow Metro.) The average time to run the full line is about 96 minutes.

== Timeline ==
Segment	Commencement	Length	Station(s)	Name
Gangduhuayuan — Moshuihu Park	1 May 2026	35.32 km (21.95 mi)	23	First Phase
Shilipu — Science Park	29 October 2026	24.58 km (15.27 mi)	14	Second phase

== Stations ==
- U/C: Under construction
- OSI: Out-of-Station Interchange

Station name		Transfer	Distance km	Location
English	Chinese	Transfer	Distance km	Location
— ↑ loop line - towards Shilipu ↑ —
Moshuihu Park	墨水湖公园			Hanyang District
Gangkoucun	港口村			Hanyang District
Fangcao Road	芳草路			Hanyang District
Sixin Middle Road	四新中路			Hanyang District
Sixin South Road	四新南路			Hanyang District
Guoboxincheng	国博新城			Hanyang District
South International Expo Center	国博中心南	6 16		Hanyang District
Jiataohe	夹套河			Hongshan District
Wuhan Academy of Agricultural Sciences	市农科院			Hongshan District
Guangxia	光霞	5		Hongshan District
Hubei Academy of Agricultural Sciences South	省农科院南			Hongshan District
Chuxiang Boulevard	楚祥大道			Hongshan District
Fu'an Street	富安街			Hongshan District
Rui'an Street East	瑞安街东			Wuchang District
East Square of Wuchang Railway Station	武昌站东广场	11; 4 7 (Both OSI via Wuchang Railway Station); WCN		Wuchang District
Wuhan No.15 Senior Middle School	十五中			Wuchang District
Hejialong	何家垅			Wuchang District
Gongzheng Road	公正路			Wuchang District
Qinyuan Middle Road	秦园中路			Wuchang District
Wangjiadun	汪家墩	8		Wuchang District
Tuanjie Boulevard	团结大道			Wuchang District
Yuanlin Road	园林路	4		Qingshan District
Gangduhuayuan	钢都花园	10 (U/C)		Qingshan District
Science Park	科普公园	5		Qingshan District
Danshuichi	丹水池	1 (OSI)		Jiang'an District
Baibuting	百步亭			Jiang'an District
Xingye Road	兴业路	3		Jiang'an District
Houhu 4th Road	后湖四路			Jiang'an District
Zhongyi Road	中一路	8 Yangluo		Jiang'an District
Shiqiao	石桥	6		Jiang'an District
North Square of Hankou Railway Station	汉口站北广场	2; 10 (U/C); HKN		Jianghan District / Qiaokou District
Hua'anli	华安里			Jianghan District / Qiaokou District
Hanxi Road North	汉西路北			Jianghan District / Qiaokou District
Shuangdun	双墩	3		Qiaokou District
Hanxi Road South	汉西路南			Qiaokou District
Hangang	汉钢			Hanyang District
Shilipu	十里铺	4		Hanyang District
— ↓ Loop line - towards Moshuihu Park ↓ —
