= Xinmiaocun station =

Metro station in Wuhan, China

Xinmiaocun 新庙村 metro
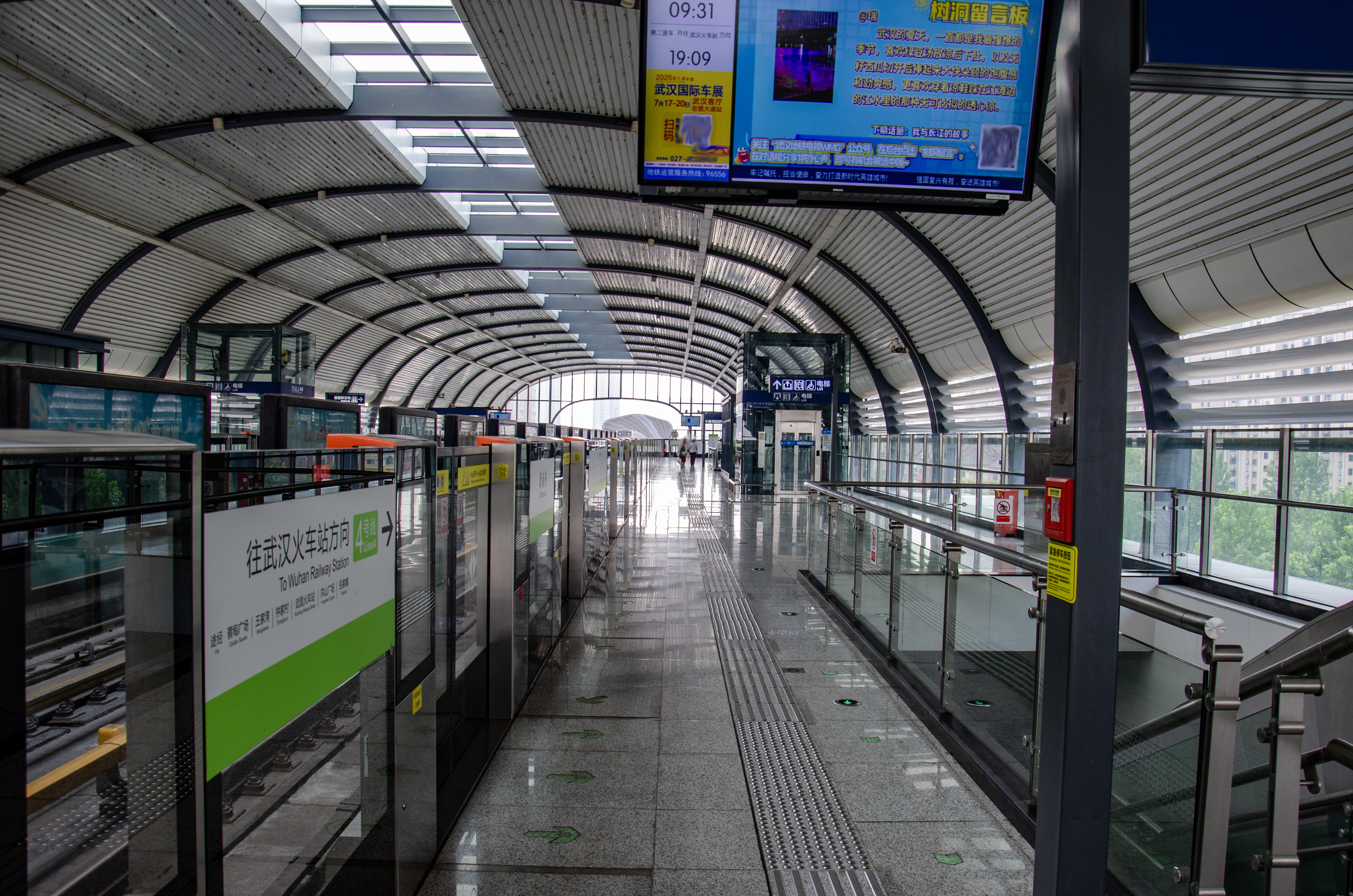
- Platform

General information
- Location: Caidian District, Wuhan, Hubei; China
- Coordinates: 30.58253°N 114.00412°E
- Operated by: Wuhan Metro Co., Ltd
- Line: Line 4
- Platforms: 2 (2 side platforms)

Construction
- Structure type: Elevated

History
- Opened: September 25, 2019 (Line 4)

Services
Preceding station	Wuhan Metro	Following station
Bailin Terminus	Line 4	Linzhang Boulevard towards Wuhan Railway Station
Location

Xinmiaocun Station (Chinese: 新庙村站) is a station of Line 4 of the Wuhan Metro. It entered service on September 25, 2019. It is located in Caidian District.

== Station layout ==
3F	Side platform, doors will open on the right
3F	Westbound	← Line 4 towards Bailin (Terminus)
3F	Eastbound	Line 4 towards Wuhan Railway Station (Linzhang Boulevard) →
3F	Side platform, doors will open on the right
2F	Concourse	Faregates, Station Agent
G	Entrances and Exits
