= Shilipu station (Wuhan Metro) =

Metro station in Wuhan, China

Shilipu 十里铺 metro
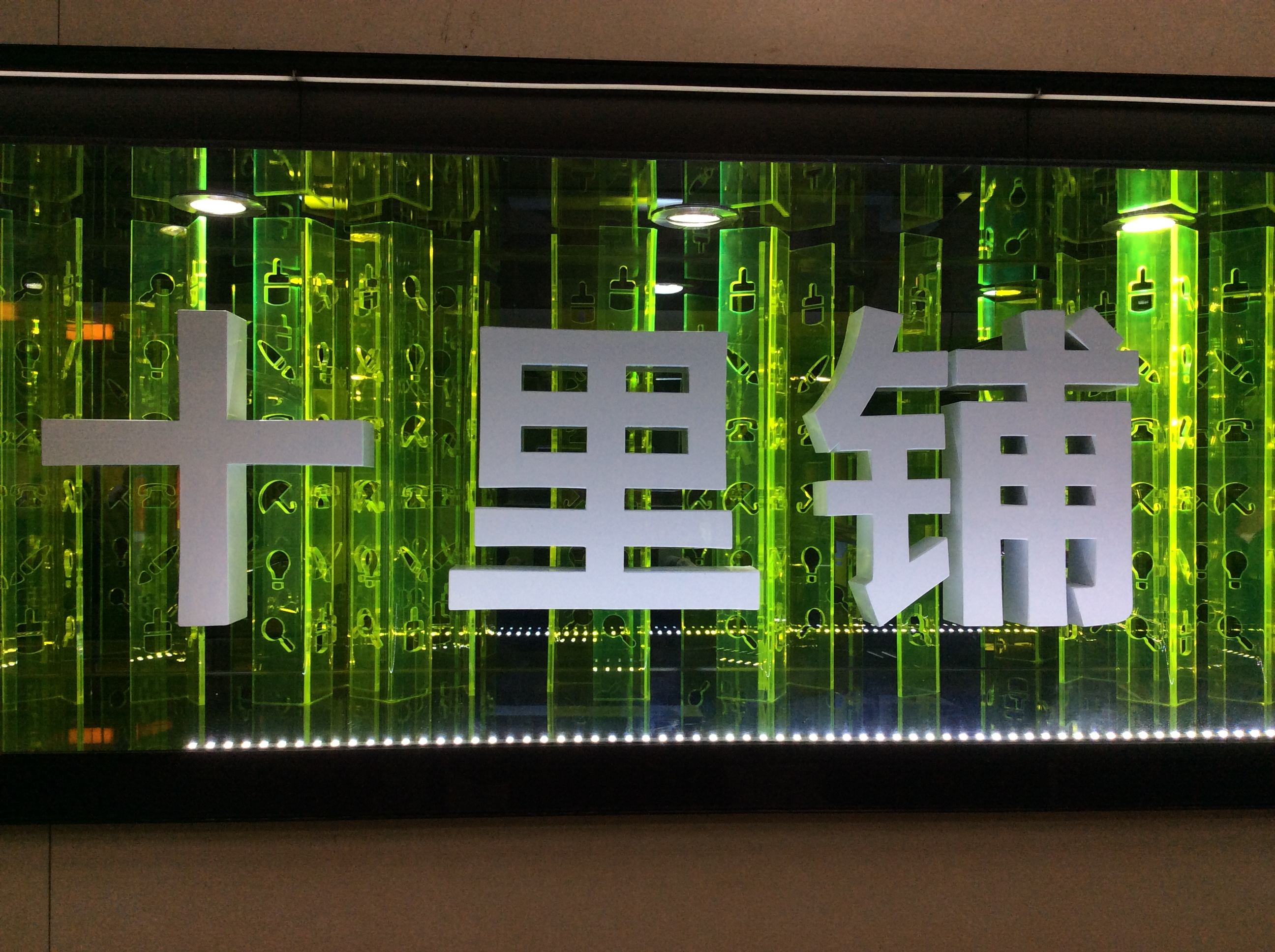

General information
- Location: Hanyang District, Wuhan, Hubei; China
- Operator: Wuhan Metro Co., Ltd
- Lines: Line 4 Line 12
- Platforms: 4 (2 island platforms)

Construction
- Structure type: Underground

History
- Opened: December 28, 2014 (Line 4); October 29, 2026 (Line 12)

Services
Preceding station	Wuhan Metro	Following station
Wangjiawan towards Bailin	Line 4	Qilimiao towards Wuhan Railway Station
Moshuihu Park Outer Circle	Line 12	Hangang Inner Circle
Location

Shilipu Station (Chinese: 十里铺站) is a station of Line 4 and Line 12 of Wuhan Metro. It entered revenue service on December 28, 2014. It is located in Hanyang District.

== Station layout ==
G	Entrances and Exits
B1	Concourse	Faregates, Station Agent
B2	Westbound	← Line 4 towards Bailin (Wangjiawan)
B2	Island platform, doors will open on the left
B2	Eastbound	Line 4 towards Wuhan Railway Station (Qilimiao) →
B3	Outer Circle	← Line 12 Outer Circle (Moshuihu Park)
B3	Island platform, doors will open on the left
B3	Inner Circle	Line 12 Inner Circle (Hangang) →
