= Line 4 (Wuhan Metro) =

Line of Wuhan Metro

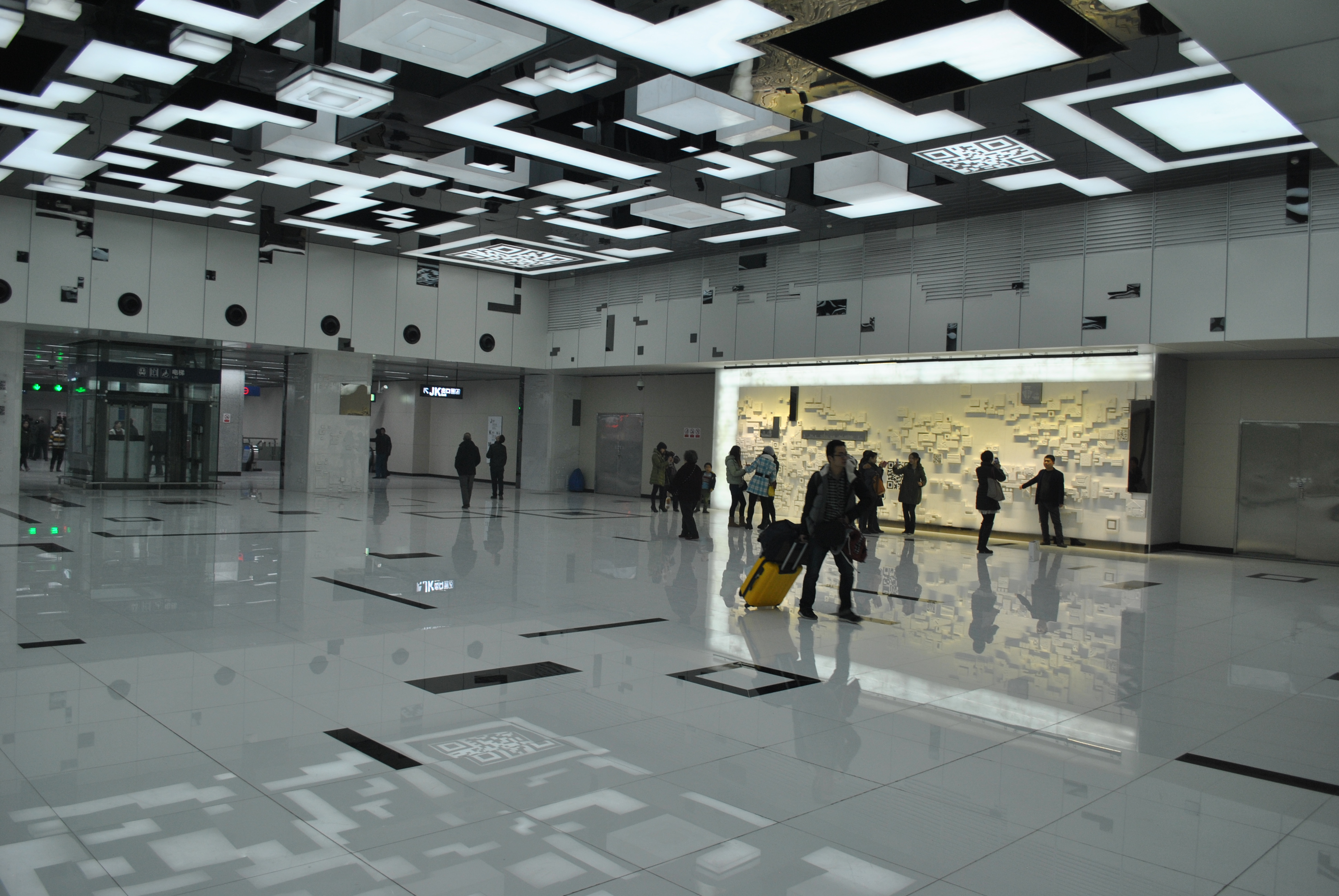
- Wangjiawan Station

Overview
- Other name: Caidian line (蔡甸线) (Western extension)
- Owner: Wuhan
- Locale: Wuhan, Hubei
- Termini: Bailin; Wuhan Railway Station
- Stations: 37

Service
- Type: Rapid transit
- System: Wuhan Metro
- Services: 1
- Operator: Wuhan Metro Group Co., Ltd.
- Rolling stock: CRRC Zhuzhou Locomotive Chinese Type B
- Daily ridership: 750,000 (2017 Daily)

History
- Opened: December 28, 2013; 12 years ago

Technical
- Line length: 49.693 km (30.88 mi)
- Num of tracks: 2
- Character: Underground and elevated
- Track gauge: 1,435 mm (4 ft 8 1/2 in)

The Line 4 of Wuhan Metro (Chinese: 武汉地铁4号线) is the third line in Wuhan Metro system and the second to cross the Yangtze river in Wuhan. It is colored grass-green.

The whole construction was divided into two parts, being phase 1 and 2, which opened in 2013 and 2014, respectively. Phase 1, opened on December 28, 2013, runs through Wuchang in a northeast-southwest direction, connecting Wuhan Railway Station, Wuchang Railway Station and major commercial districts. Phase 2 opened a year later and runs in an east-west direction, linking Hanyang and Wuchang, tunneling through the Yangtze river in the proximity of the first Yangtze river bridge and connecting with phase 1 at Wuchang railway station.

The opening of phase 1 of Line 4 will form the skeleton of Wuhan's metro system. Right after its opening, the system (including Line 1, 2, and 4) will be able to accommodate millions of passengers a day, where a large proportion of them will be the cross-Yangtze passengers. But all stations on line 4 have been designed only to accommodate a six-car train (type B) in length and have no possibility to extend for future upgrading.

== Overview ==
Map of Line 4

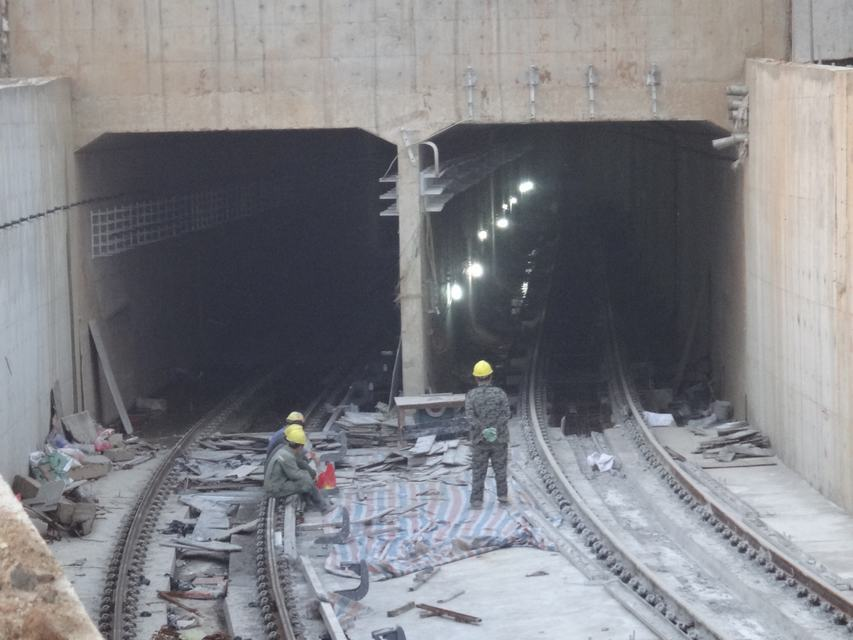
Tunnels under construction

== History ==
- Phase 1 opened on December 28, 2013.
- Phase 2 opened on December 28, 2014.
- Caidian line (Western extension) opened on 25 September 2019.

Segment	Commencement	Length	Station(s)	Name
Wuchang Railway Station — Wuhan Railway Station	28 December 2013	15.429 km (9.59 mi)	15	Phase 1
Huangjinkou — Wuchang Railway Station	28 December 2014	17.974 km (11.17 mi)	13	Phase 2
Huangjinkou — Bailin	25 September 2019	16.068 km (9.98 mi)	9	Caidian line (Western extension)

== Stations ==
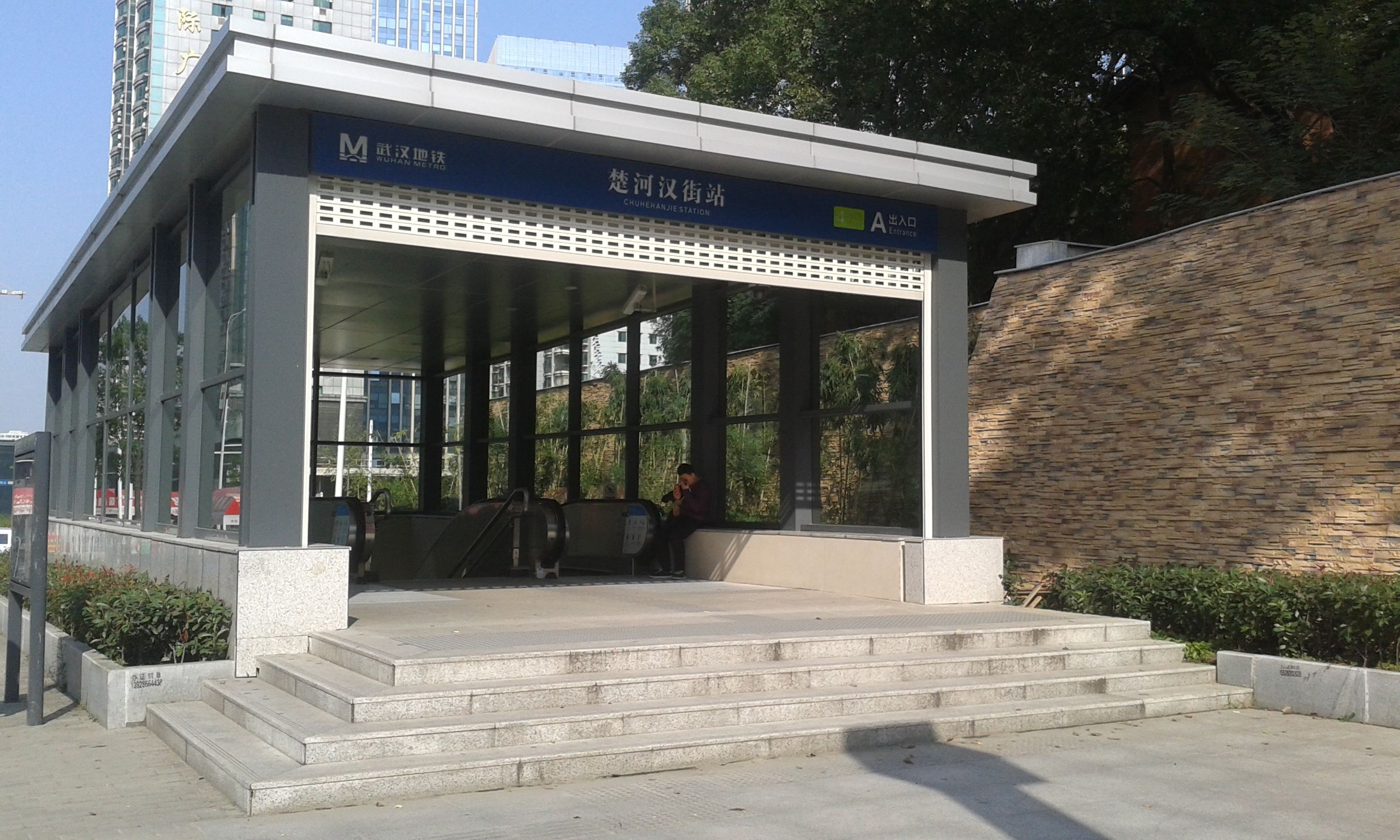
Entrance of Chuhehanjie station.

Service routes		Station name		Connections	Distance km		Location
Service routes		English	Chinese	Connections	Distance km		Location
●		Bailin	柏林		0.000	0.000	Caidian
●		Xinmiaocun	新庙村		1.417	1.417	Caidian
●		Linzhang Boulevard	临嶂大道		2.081	3.498	Caidian
●		Caidian Square	蔡甸广场		1.241	4.739	Caidian
●		Fenghuang Road	凤凰路		2.148	6.887	Caidian
●		Xinnong	新农		1.453	8.340	Caidian
●		Zhiyin	知音		1.820	10.160	Caidian
●		Jixian	集贤		2.011	12.171	Caidian
●		Xintian	新天		1.367	13.538	Caidian
●		Huangjinkou	黄金口		2.750	16.288	Hanyang
●		Mengjiapu	孟家铺		2.762	19.050	Hanyang
●		Yong'antang	永安堂		1.479	20.529	Hanyang
●	●	Yulong Road	玉龙路		1.243	21.772	Hanyang
●	●	Wangjiawan	王家湾	3	0.901	22.673	Hanyang
●	●	Shilipu	十里铺	12	0.950	23.623	Hanyang
●	●	Qilimiao	七里庙		1.204	24.827	Hanyang
●	●	Wulidun	五里墩		1.124	25.951	Hanyang
●	●	Hanyang Railway Station	汉阳火车站	HYN	1.012	26.963	Hanyang
●	●	Zhongjiacun	钟家村	6	1.574	28.537	Hanyang
●	●	Lanjiang Road	拦江路		0.834	29.371	Hanyang
●	●	Fuxing Road	复兴路	5; 11 (Note: Out of system transfer at Ziyanghu)	3.278	32.649	Wuchang
●	●	Shouyi Road	首义路		0.718	33.367	Wuchang
●	●	Wuchang Railway Station	武昌火车站	7; 11 12 (Note: Out of system transfer at East Square of Wuchang Railway Station); WCN: WXN	0.897	34.264	Wuchang
●	●	Meiyuanxiaoqu	梅苑小区		0.900	35.164	Wuchang
●	●	Zhongnan Road	中南路	2	1.095	36.259	Wuchang
●	●	Hongshan Square	洪山广场	2	0.966	37.225	Wuchang
●	●	Chuhe Hanjie	楚河汉街		1.077	38.302	Wuchang
●	●	Qingyuzui	青鱼嘴		1.226	39.528	Wuchang
●	●	Dongting	东亭		1.048	40.576	Wuchang
●	●	Yuejiazui	岳家嘴	8	0.928	41.504	Wuchang / Hongshan
●	●	Tieji Road	铁机路		1.032	42.536	Hongshan
●	●	Luojiagang	罗家港		1.171	43.707	Hongshan
●	●	Yuanlin Road	园林路	12	1.036	44.743	Hongshan
●	●	Renhe Road	仁和路		1.333	46.076	Hongshan
●	●	Gongye 4th Road	工业四路		1.634	47.710	Hongshan
●	●	Yangchunhu	杨春湖		1.173	48.883	Hongshan
●	●	Wuhan Railway Station	武汉火车站	5 (Note: Out of system transfer at East Square of Wuhan Railway Station) 19 (Note: Out of system transfer at West Square of Wuhan Railway Station); WHN: WG WS	0.810	49.693	Hongshan

== Rolling stock ==
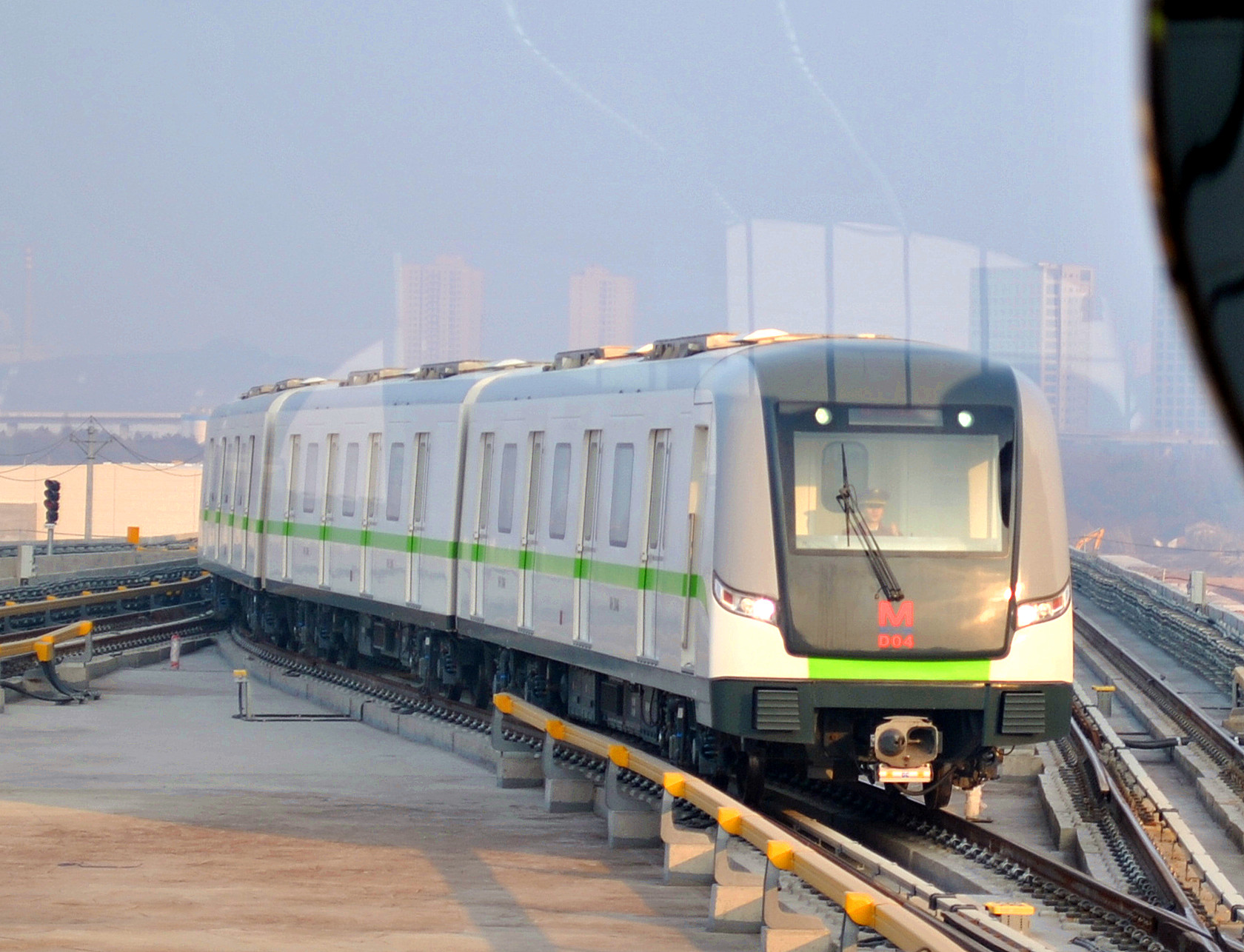
Line 4 train

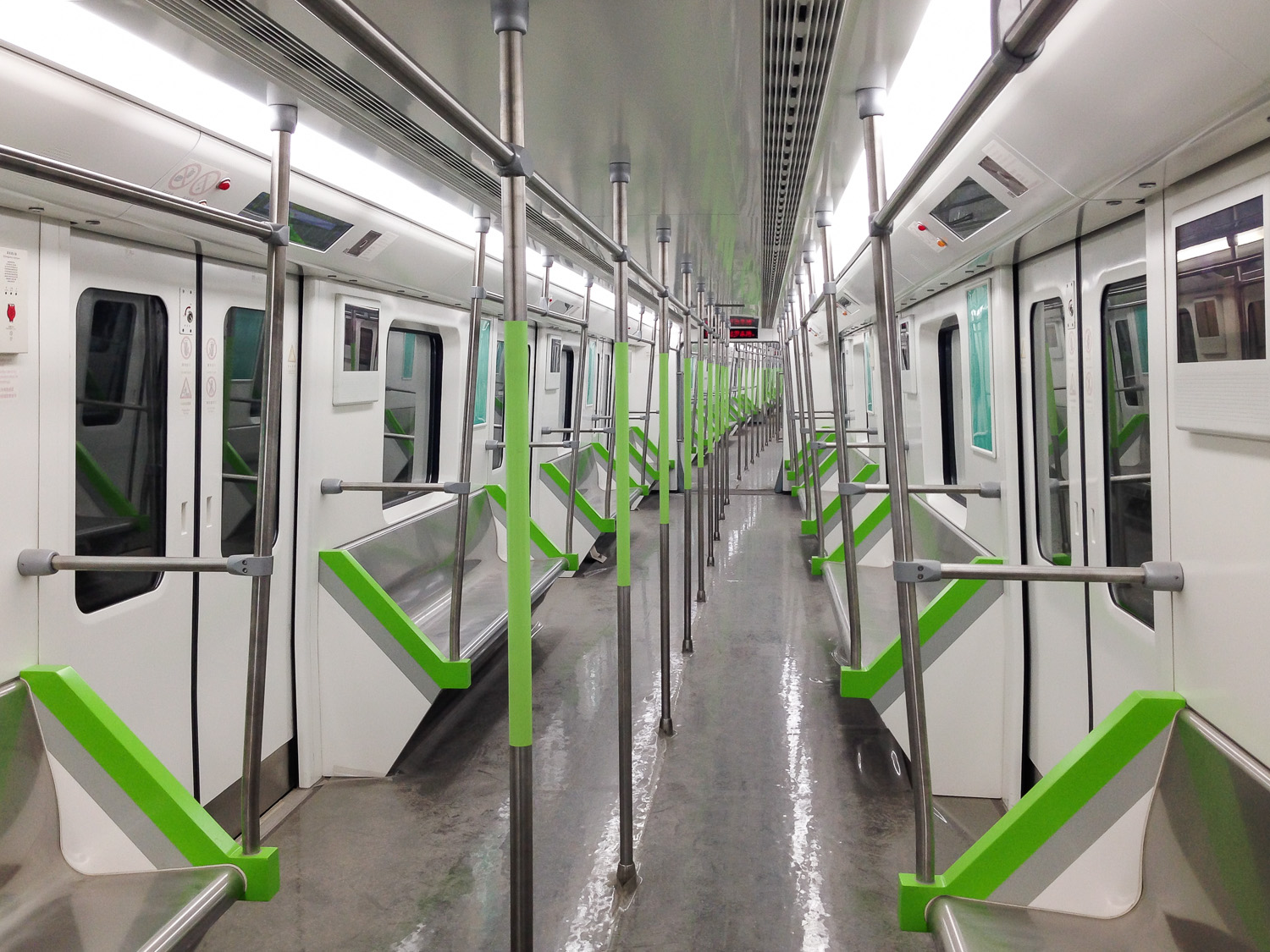
Inside the train

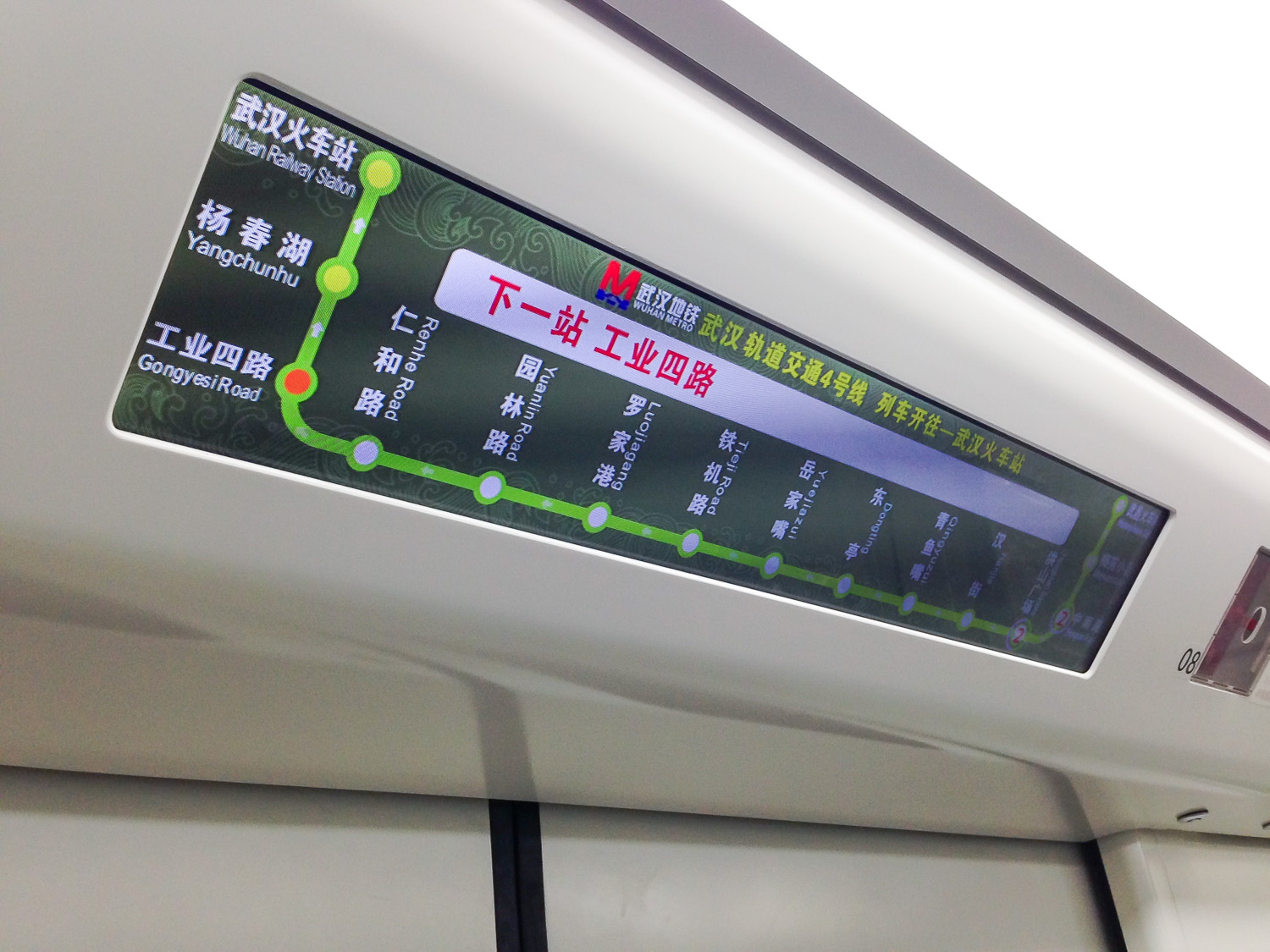
Interior LCD

Type	Time of manufacturing	Sets	Assembly	Notes
Type B	2012–2013	15	Tc+M+M+M+M+Tc	Manufactured by Zhuzhou Electric Locomotive Co., Ltd.
Type B	2014	24	Tc+M+M+M+M+Tc
Type B	2018	31	Tc+M+M+M+M+Tc

The rolling stock for Line 4 is a 6-car train, with 100 km/h (62 mph) of max speed, 80 km/h (50 mph) of operation max speed, and 36.6 km/h (22.7 mph) average speed. The collection shoe is on the lower part of the vehicle. The third rail is a mix of steel and aluminum. A full train provides 176 seats, and can carry 1276 passengers by Chinese regulation of 9 people per square meter.

== See also ==
- Wuhan Metro
- Wuhan
