= Bailin station =

Metro station in Wuhan, China

Bailin 柏林
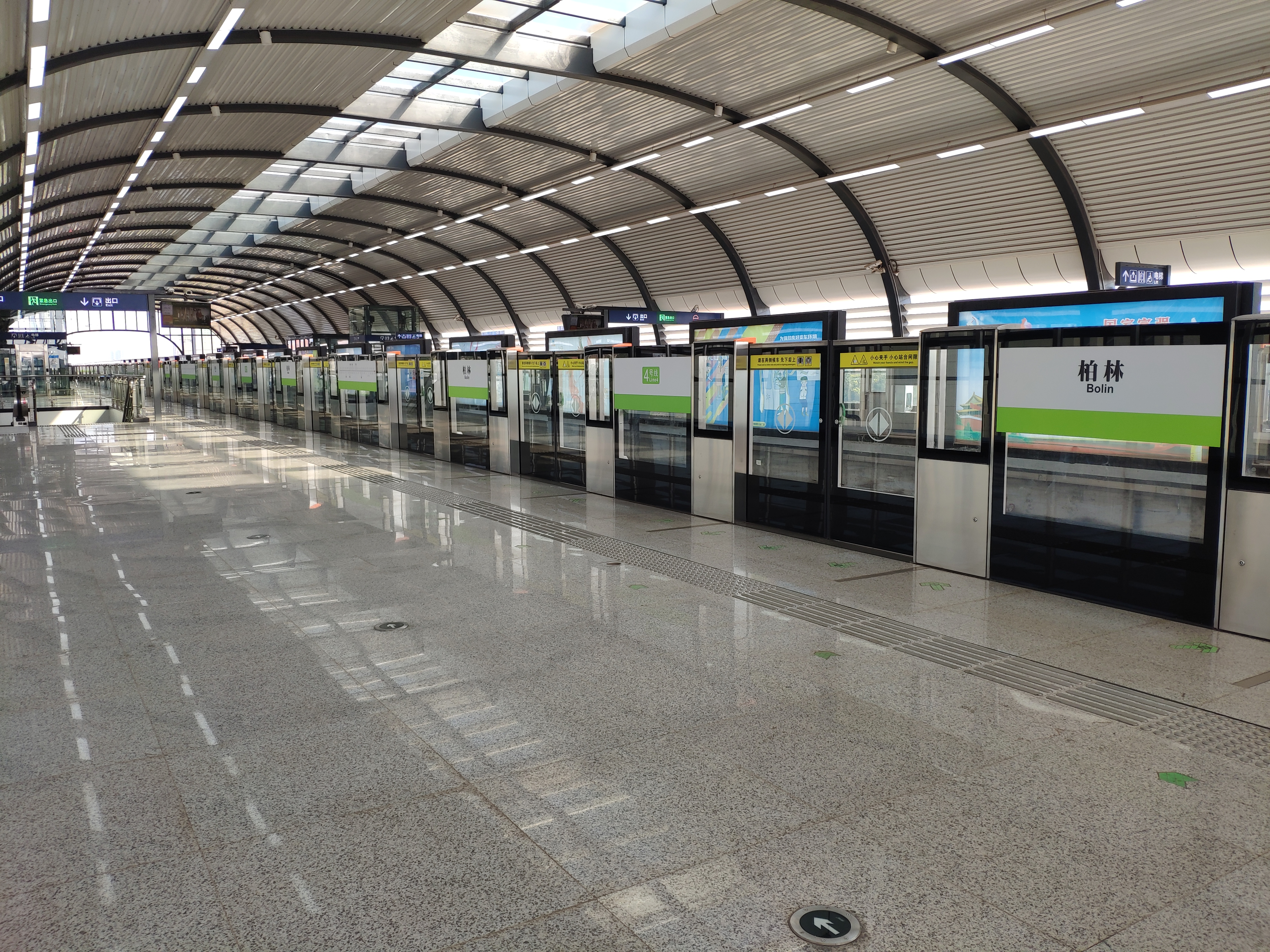

General information
- Location: Caidian District, Wuhan, Hubei; China
- Coordinates: 30.584728°N 113.989292°E
- Operated by: Wuhan Metro Co., Ltd
- Line: Line 4
- Platforms: 2 (2 side platforms)

Construction
- Structure type: Elevated

History
- Opened: 25 September 2019 (Line 4)

Services
Preceding station	Wuhan Metro	Following station
Terminus	Line 4	Xinmiaocun towards Wuhan Railway Station
Location

Bailin station (Chinese: 柏林站; pinyin: Bǎilín zhàn) is a station of Line 4 of Wuhan Metro. It entered revenue service on 25 September 2019. It is located in Caidian District and it is the western terminus of Line 4.

== Station layout ==
3F	Side platform, doors will open on the right
3F	Westbound	← Line 4 termination platform
3F	Eastbound	Line 4 towards Wuhan Railway Station (Xinmiaocun) →
3F	Side platform, doors will open on the right
2F	Concourse	Faregates, Station Agent
G	Entrances and Exits	Exits A-D

== Gallery ==
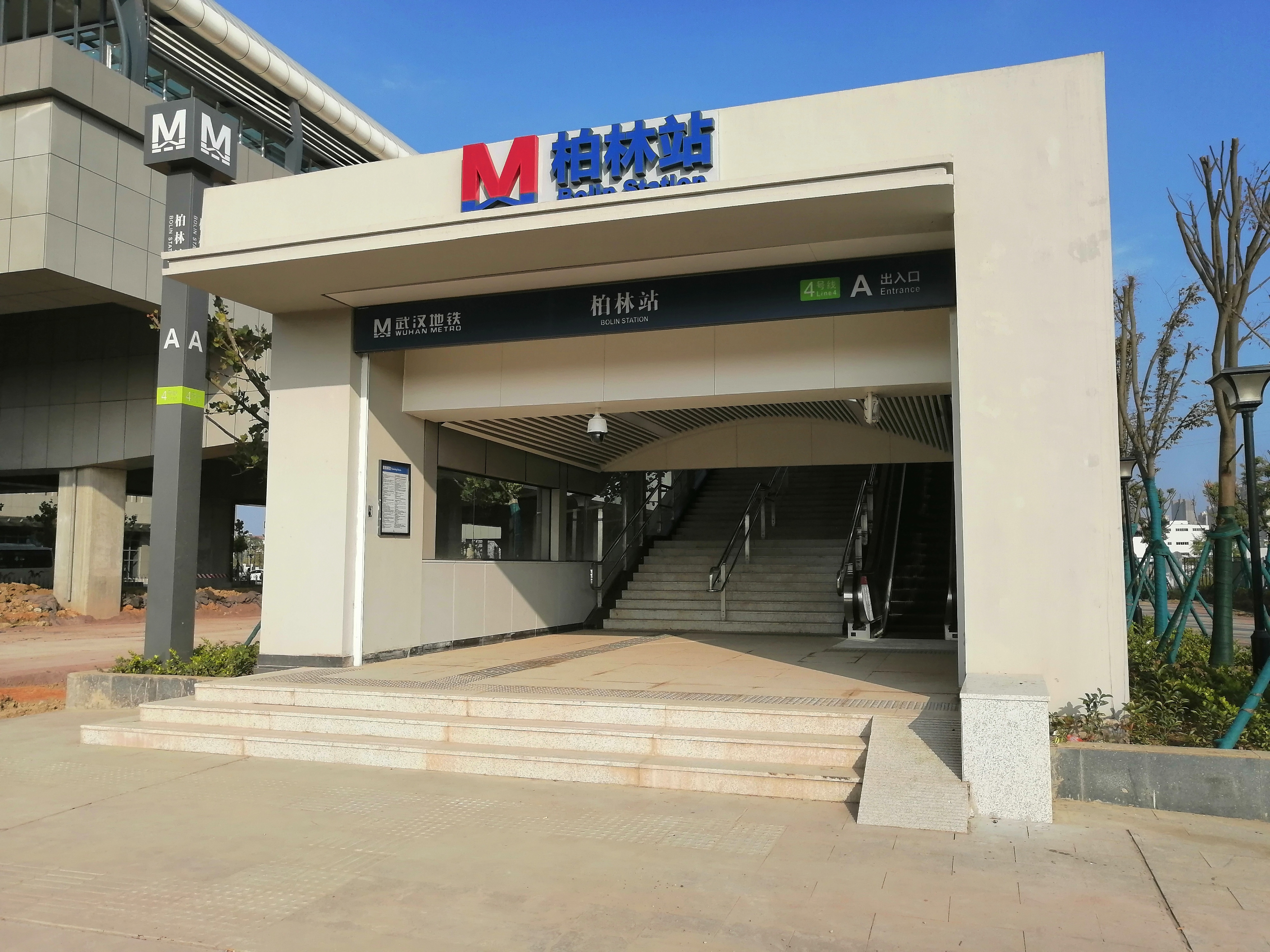
Entrance A

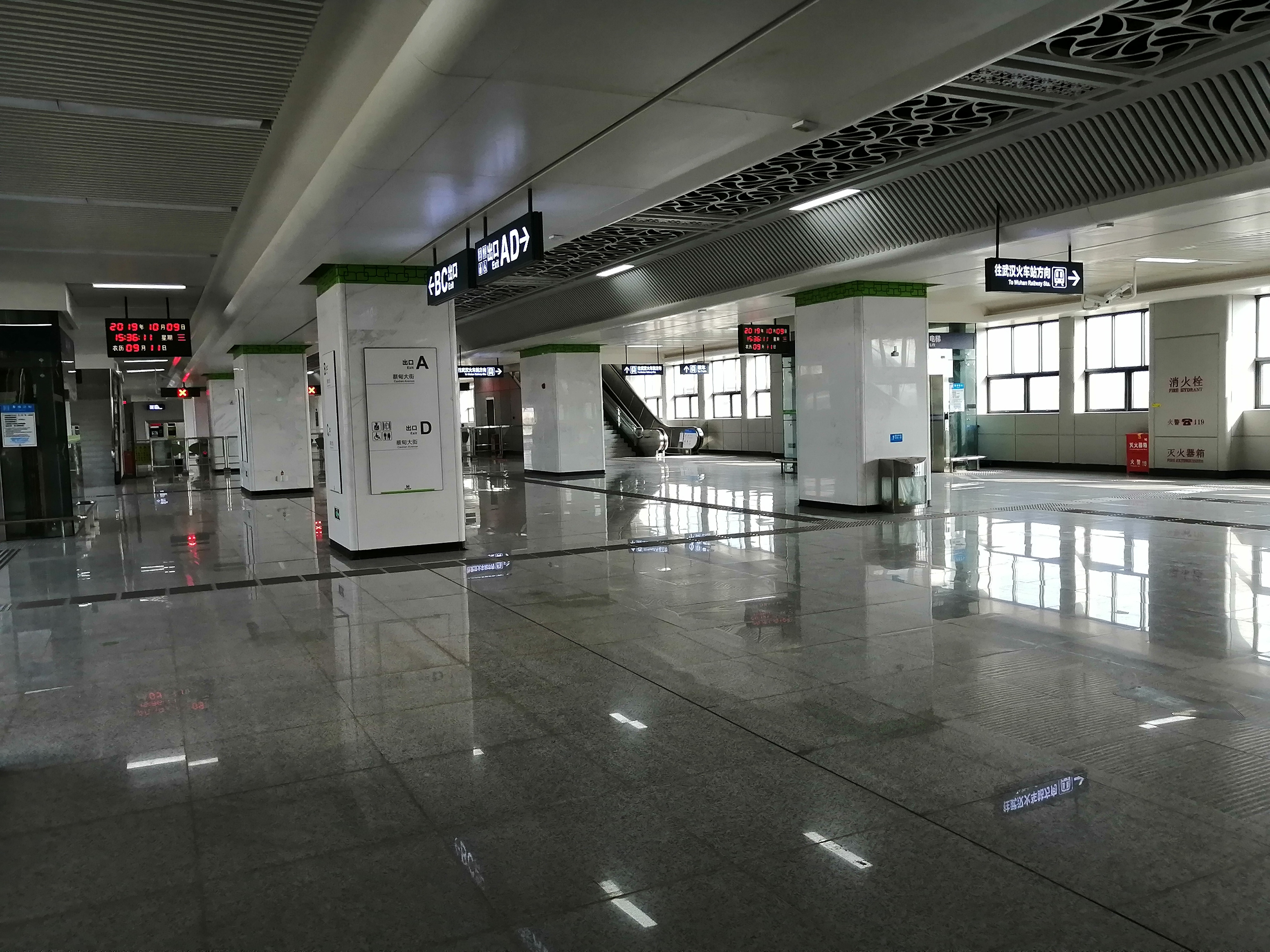
Concourse

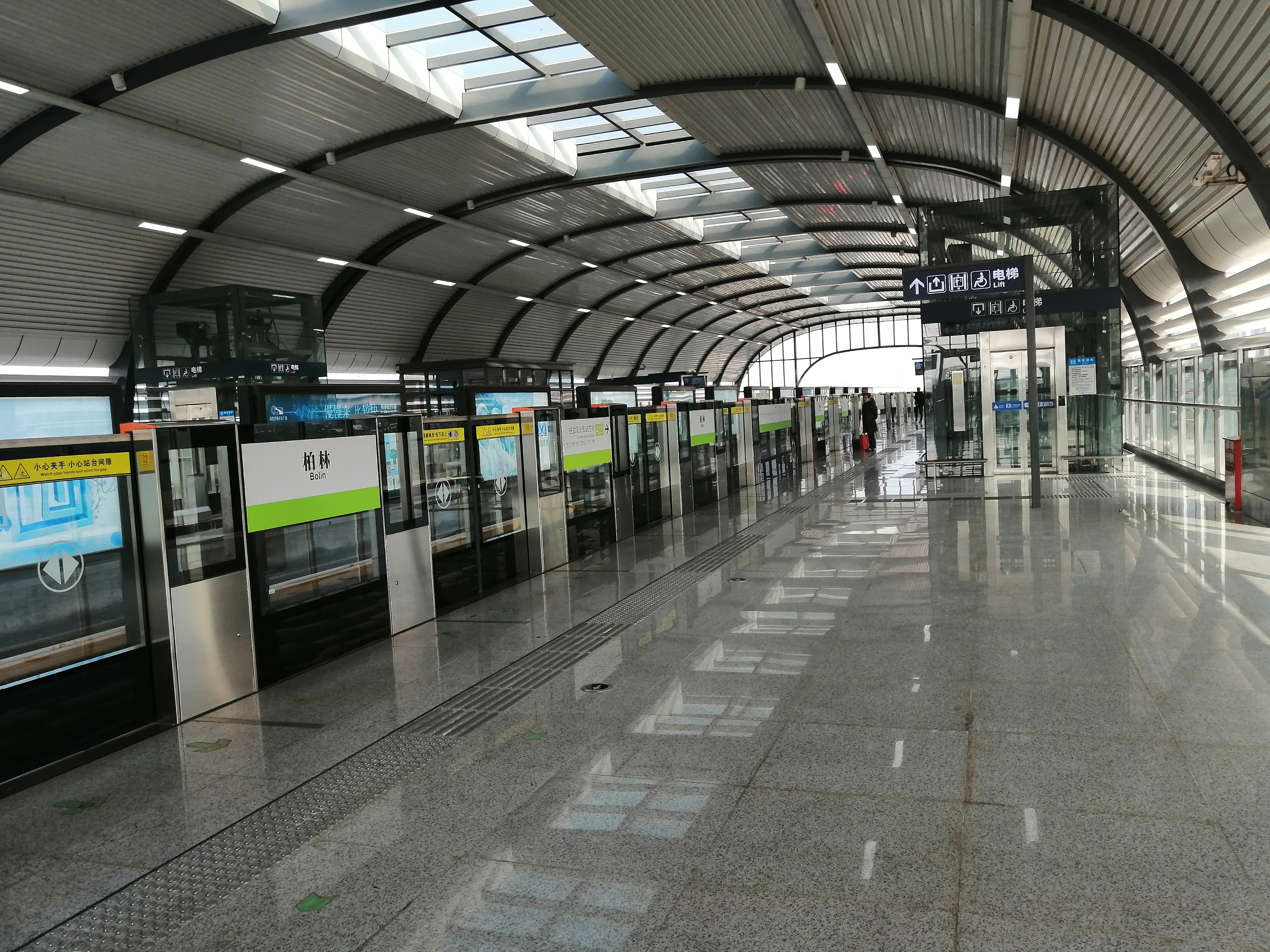
Platform

== Naming in English ==
In writing, the Chinese name of this station is the same with "Berlin", the capital city of Germany. The English name came from the romanization of such Chinese name was first written as "Bolin", same with the pronunciation of Berlin in Chinese, and thus it appeared in news reports jokingly as "a Wuhan Metro line that can take you to Germany".

Shortly after the opening of this station, the local government decided to change the English name to "Bailin", an alternative way to pronounce the Chinese name, because the place name "Bailin" in Caidian District actually comes from a Platycladus forest in the area.
