= Hanyang Long-Distance Bus Station =

Metro station in Wuhan, China

Hanyang Long-Distance Bus Station 汉阳客运站 metro

General information
- Location: Caidian District, Wuhan, Hubei; China
- Operated by: Wuhan Metro Co., Ltd
- Line: Line 3
- Platforms: 2 (1 island platform)

Construction
- Structure type: Underground

History
- Opened: December 28, 2015 (Line 3)

Services
Preceding station	Wuhan Metro	Following station
Sixin Boulevard towards Hongtu Boulevard	Line 3	Sanjiaohu towards Zhuanyang Boulevard
Location

Hanyang Long-Distance Bus Station (Chinese: 汉阳客运站) is a transport hub and metro station on Line 3 of the Wuhan Metro. It entered revenue service on December 28, 2015. It is located in Caidian District.

== Station layout ==
G	Entrances and Exits	Exits A-D
B1	Concourse	Faregates, Station Agent
B2	Northbound	← Line 3 towards Hongtu Boulevard (Sixin Boulevard)
B2	Island platform, doors will open on the left
B2	Southbound	Line 3 towards Zhuanyang Boulevard (Sanjiaohu) →
