= Sanjiaohu station =

Metro station in Wuhan, China

Sanjiaohu 三角湖 metro
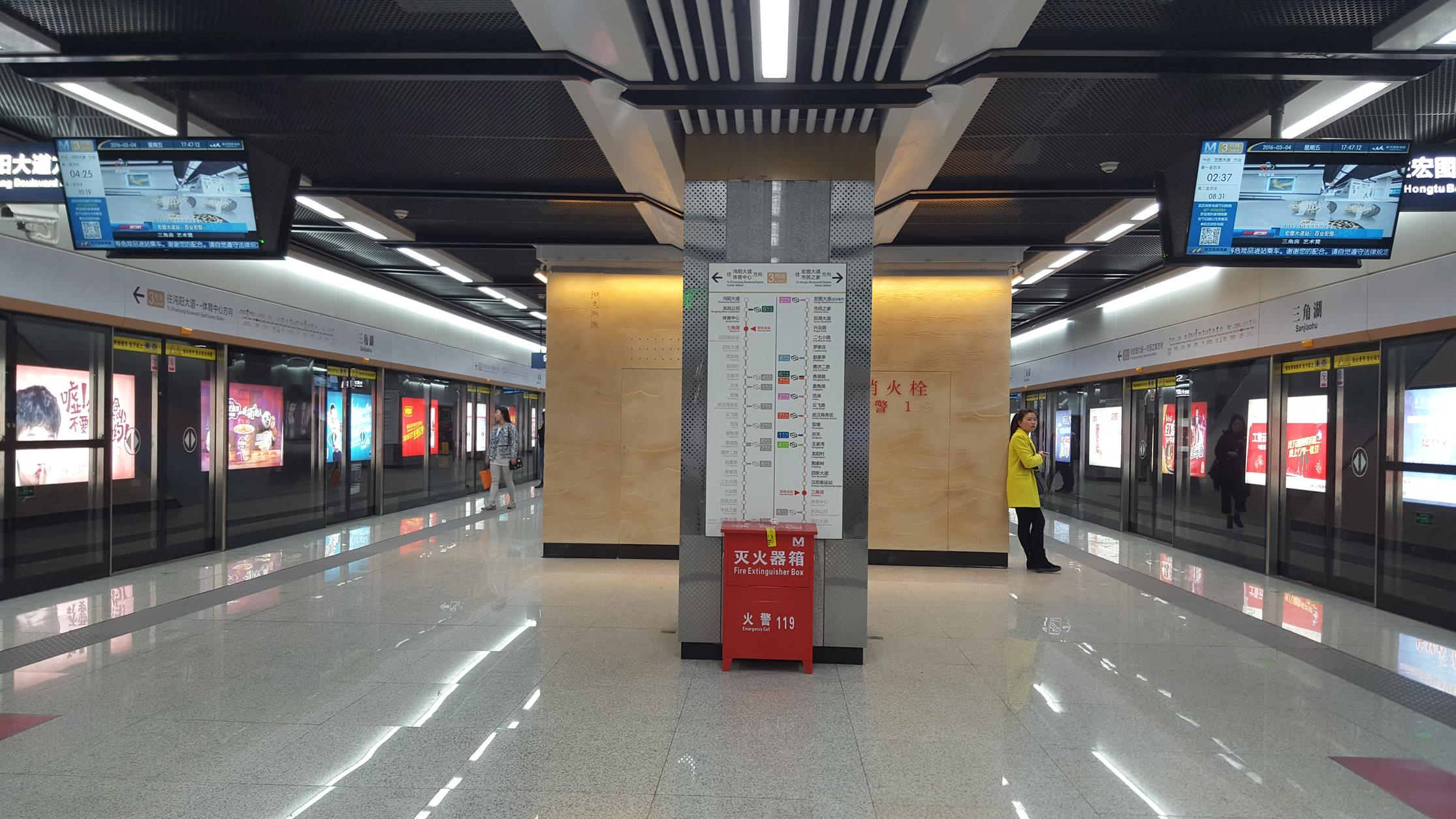

General information
- Location: Caidian District, Wuhan, Hubei; China
- Operated by: Wuhan Metro Co., Ltd
- Line: Line 3
- Platforms: 2 (1 island platform)

Construction
- Structure type: Underground

History
- Opened: December 28, 2015 (Line 3)

Services
Preceding station	Wuhan Metro	Following station
Hanyang Long-Distance Bus Station towards Hongtu Boulevard	Line 3	Sports Center towards Zhuanyang Boulevard
Location

Sanjiaohu Station (Chinese: 三角湖站), formerly known as Shengguandu Station (Chinese: 升官渡站), is a station of Line 3 of Wuhan Metro. It entered revenue service on December 28, 2015. It is located in Caidian District.

== Station layout ==
G	Entrances and Exits	Exits A-D
B1	Concourse	Faregates, Station Agent
B2	Northbound	← Line 3 towards Hongtu Boulevard (Hanyang Long-Distance Bus Station)
B2	Island platform, doors will open on the left
B2	Southbound	Line 3 towards Zhuanyang Boulevard (Sports Center) →

== Gallery ==
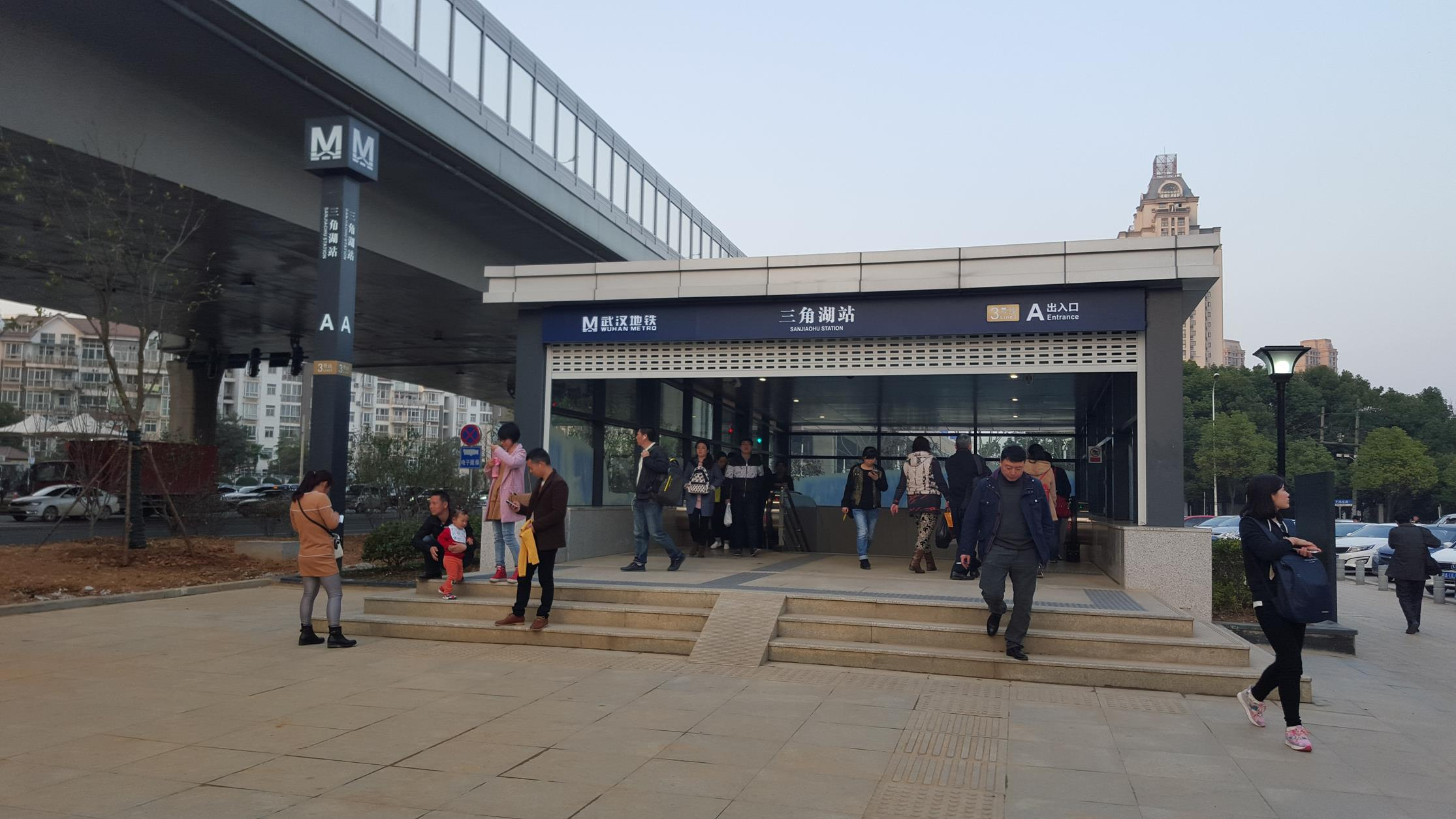
Entrance A

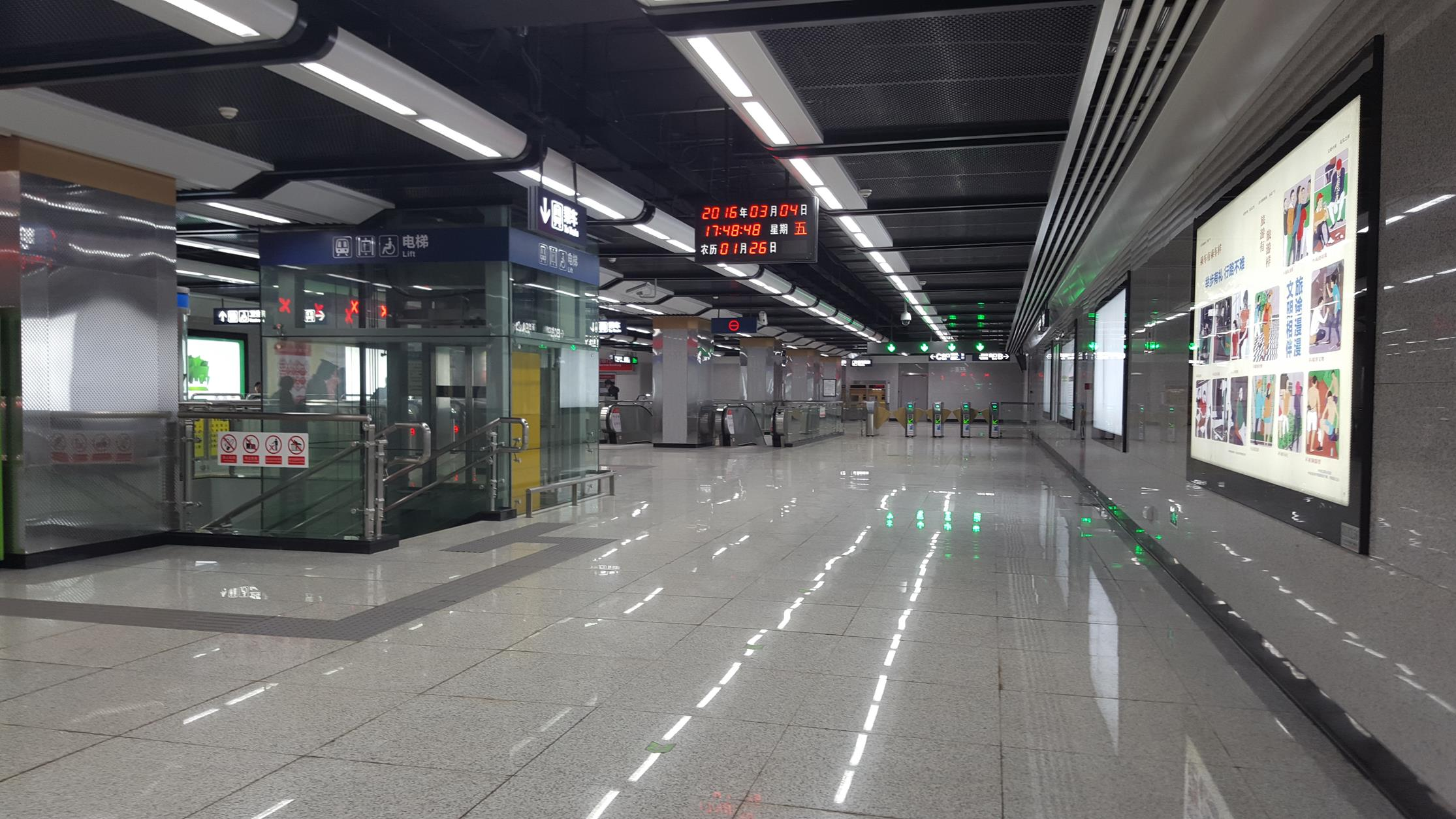
Concourse
