= Sixin Boulevard station =

Metro station in Wuhan, China

Sixin Boulevard 四新大道
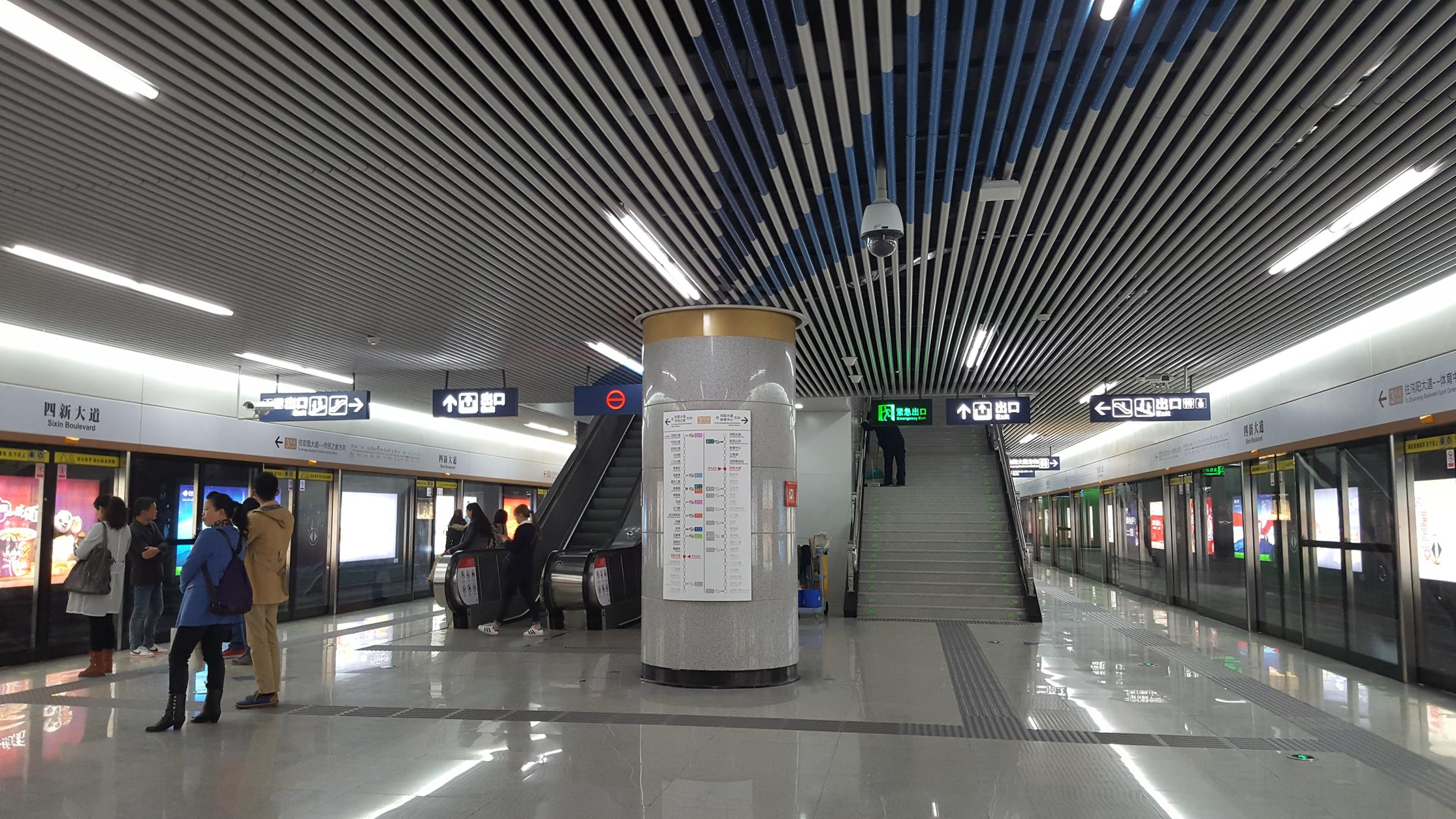

General information
- Location: Caidian District, Wuhan, Hubei; China
- Operated by: Wuhan Metro Co., Ltd
- Line: Line 3
- Platforms: 2 (1 island platform)

Construction
- Structure type: Underground

History
- Opened: December 28, 2015 (Line 3)

Services
Preceding station	Wuhan Metro	Following station
Taojialing towards Hongtu Boulevard	Line 3	Hanyang Long-Distance Bus Station towards Zhuanyang Boulevard
Location

Sixin Boulevard Station (Chinese: 四新大道站) is a station of Line 3 of the Wuhan Metro system. Located in Caidian District, it entered service on December 28, 2015.

== Station layout ==
G	Entrances and Exits	Exits A-D
B1	Concourse	Faregates, Station Agent
B2	Northbound	← Line 3 towards Hongtu Boulevard (Taojialing)
B2	Island platform, doors will open on the left
B2	Southbound	Line 3 towards Zhuanyang Boulevard (Hanyang Long-Distance Bus Station) →
