= Wuhan Sports Center Gymnasium =

Sports venue in Wuhan, China

Coordinates: 30°30′15″N 114°10′08″E

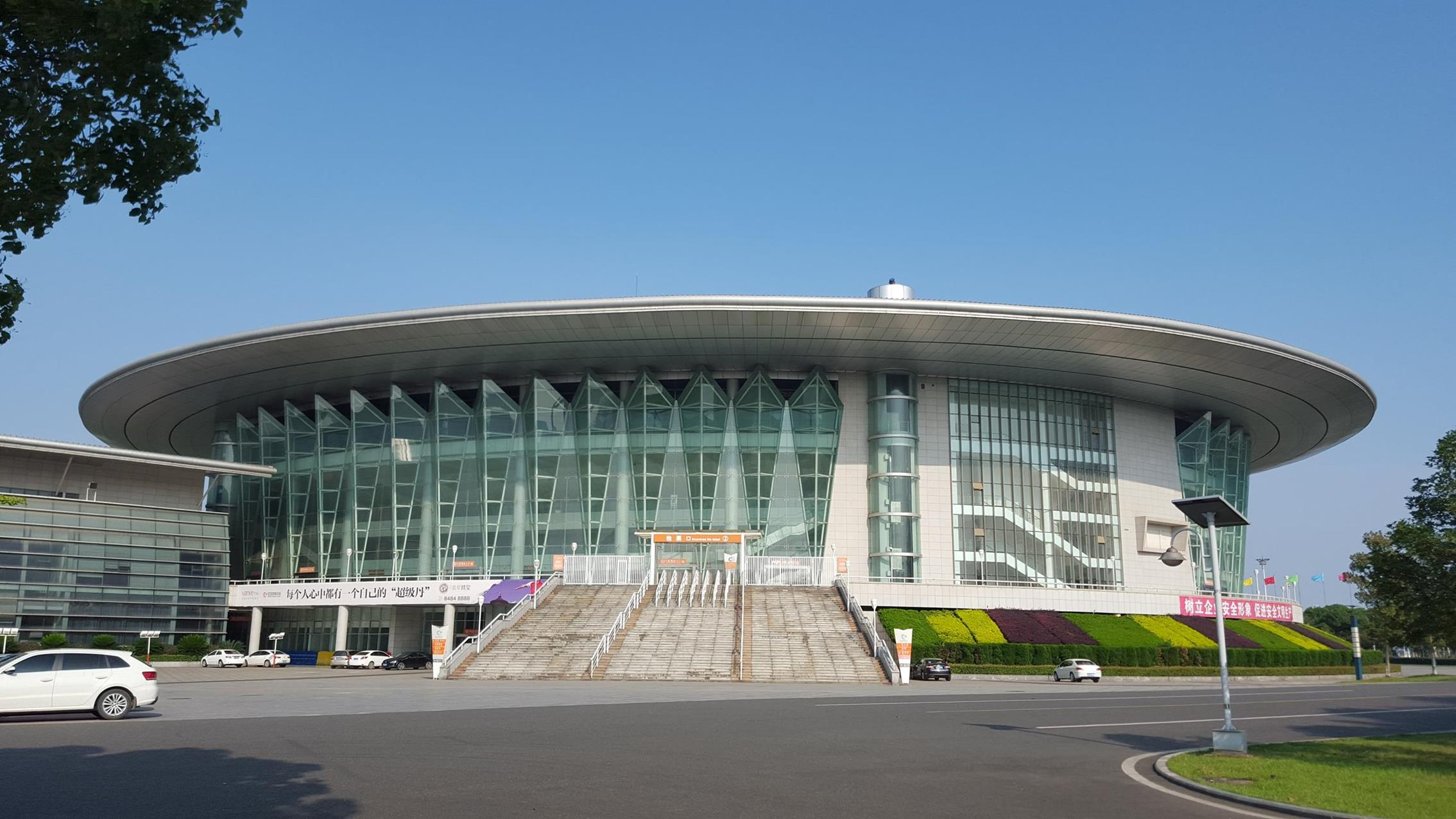
- Interactive map of Wuhan Sports Center Gymnasium
- Full name: Wuhan Sports Center Gymnasium
- Address: 58 Checheng N Rd, Caidian District, Wuhan, Hubei, China
- Capacity: 13,000
- Public transit: Sports Center 3 Dongfeng Motor Corporation 3; 6

Construction
- Opened: January 19, 2007

Wuhan Sports Center Gymnasium (Chinese: 武汉体育中心体育馆) is an indoor sporting arena in Wuhan, China. The capacity of the arena is 13,000 spectators. It hosts indoor sporting events such as basketball and volleyball. It was the main venue for the 2011 FIBA Asia Championship. It is also venue for the 2014 FIBA Asia Cup. It is located near Wuhan Sports Center Stadium. It was also the site for the Play-In and Group Stage for the 2017 League of Legends Worlds.

== See also ==
- Wuhan Sports Center Stadium
- List of indoor arenas in China
