= Longyangcun station =

Metro station in Wuhan, China

Longyangcun 龙阳村 metro

General information
- Location: Hanyang District, Wuhan, Hubei; China
- Coordinates: 30.5555°N 114.2010°E
- Operated by: Wuhan Metro Co., Ltd
- Line: Line 3
- Platforms: 2 (1 island platform)

Construction
- Structure type: Underground

History
- Opened: December 28, 2015 (Line 3)

Services
Preceding station	Wuhan Metro	Following station
Wangjiawan towards Hongtu Boulevard	Line 3	Taojialing towards Zhuanyang Boulevard
Location

Longyangcun Station (Chinese: 龙阳村站) is a station of Line 3 of Wuhan Metro. It entered revenue service on December 28, 2015. It is located in Hanyang District.

== Station layout ==
G	Entrances and Exits	Exits A-D
B1	Concourse	Faregates, Station Agent
B2	Northbound	← Line 3 towards Hongtu Boulevard (Wangjiawan)
B2	Island platform, doors will open on the left
B2	Southbound	Line 3 towards Zhuanyang Boulevard (Taojialing) →
