= Yunfei Road station =

Metro station in Wuhan, China

Yunfei Road 云飞路 metro
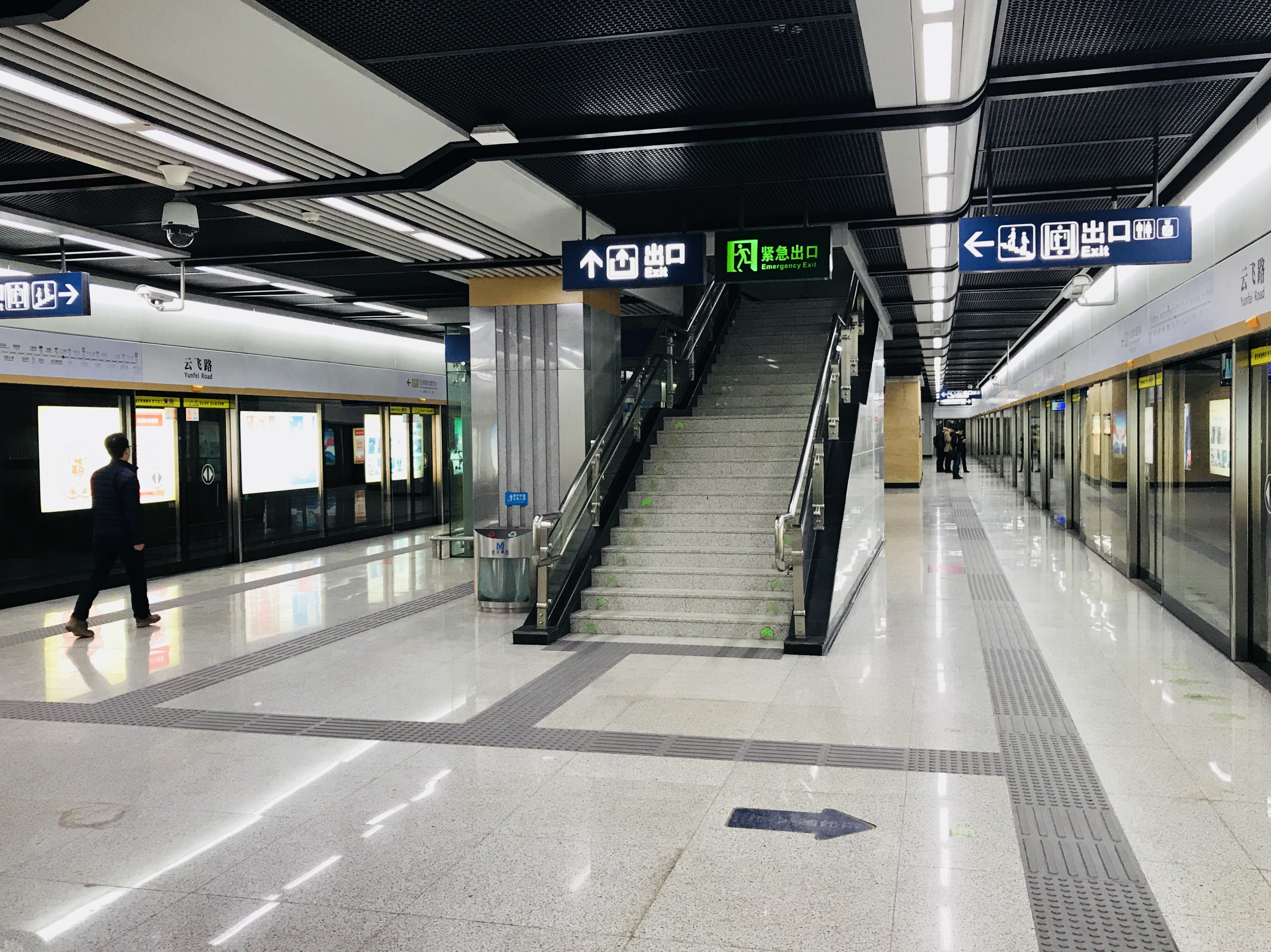

General information
- Location: Jianghan District, Wuhan, Hubei; China
- Coordinates: 30°36′26.86″N 114°14′48.41″E
- Operated by: Wuhan Metro Co., Ltd
- Line: Line 3
- Platforms: 2 (1 island platform)

Construction
- Structure type: Underground

History
- Opened: December 28, 2015 (Line 3)

Services
| Preceding station | Wuhan Metro | Following station |
|---|---|---|
| Fanhu towards Hongtu Boulevard | Line 3 | Wuhan Business District towards Zhuanyang Boulevard |
Location

Yunfei Road Station (Chinese: 云飞路站) is a station of Line 3 of Wuhan Metro. It entered revenue service on December 28, 2015. It is located in Jianghan District. This station used to be known as Wangjiadun North Station (Chinese: 王家墩北站).

== Station layout ==
| G | Entrances and Exits | Exits A-E |
| B1 | Concourse | Faregates, Station Agent |
| B2 | Northbound | ← Line 3 towards Hongtu Boulevard (Fanhu) |
| B2 | Island platform, doors will open on the left |
| B2 | Southbound | Line 3 towards Zhuanyang Boulevard (Wuhan Business District) → |
