= Sports Center station (Wuhan Metro) =

Metro station in Wuhan, China

Sports Center 体育中心
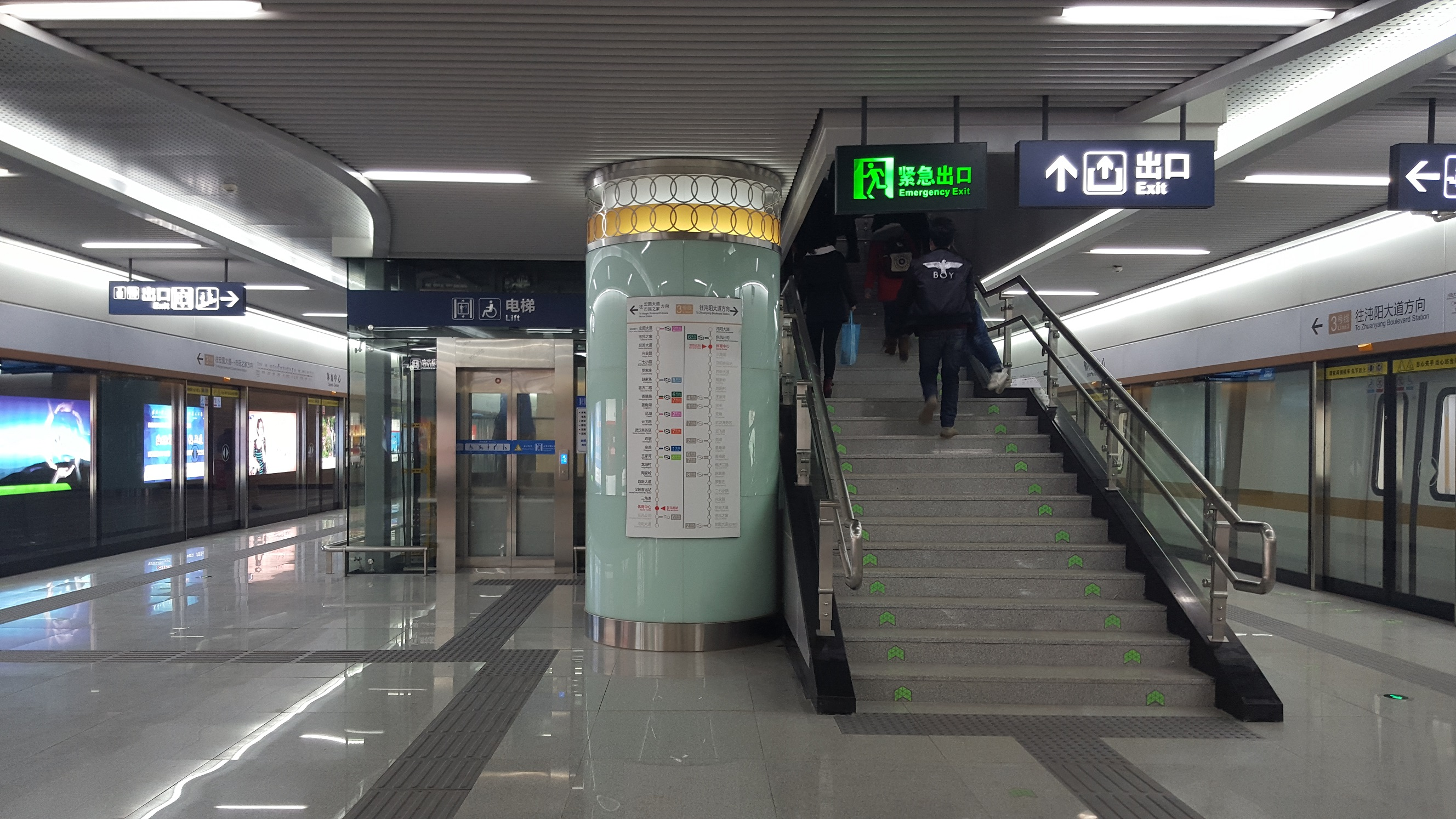

General information
- Location: Caidian District, Wuhan, Hubei; China
- Operated by: Wuhan Metro Co., Ltd
- Line: Line 3
- Platforms: 2 (1 island platform)

Construction
- Structure type: Underground

History
- Opened: December 28, 2015 (Line 3)

Services
| Preceding station | Wuhan Metro | Following station |
|---|---|---|
| Sanjiaohu towards Hongtu Boulevard | Line 3 | Dongfeng Motor Corporation towards Zhuanyang Boulevard |
Location

Sports Center Station (Chinese: 体育中心站) is a station of Line 3 of Wuhan Metro. It entered revenue service on December 28, 2015. It is located in Caidian District. This station used to be known as Sports Center North Station during construction (Chinese: 体育中心北站). It is near Wuhan Sports Center Stadium.

== Station layout ==
| G | Entrances and Exits | Exits A-D |
| B1 | Concourse | Faregates, Station Agent |
| B2 | Northbound | ← Line 3 towards Hongtu Boulevard (Sanjiaohu) |
| B2 | Island platform, doors will open on the left |
| B2 | Southbound | Line 3 towards Zhuanyang Boulevard (Dongfeng Motor Corporation) → |

== Gallery ==
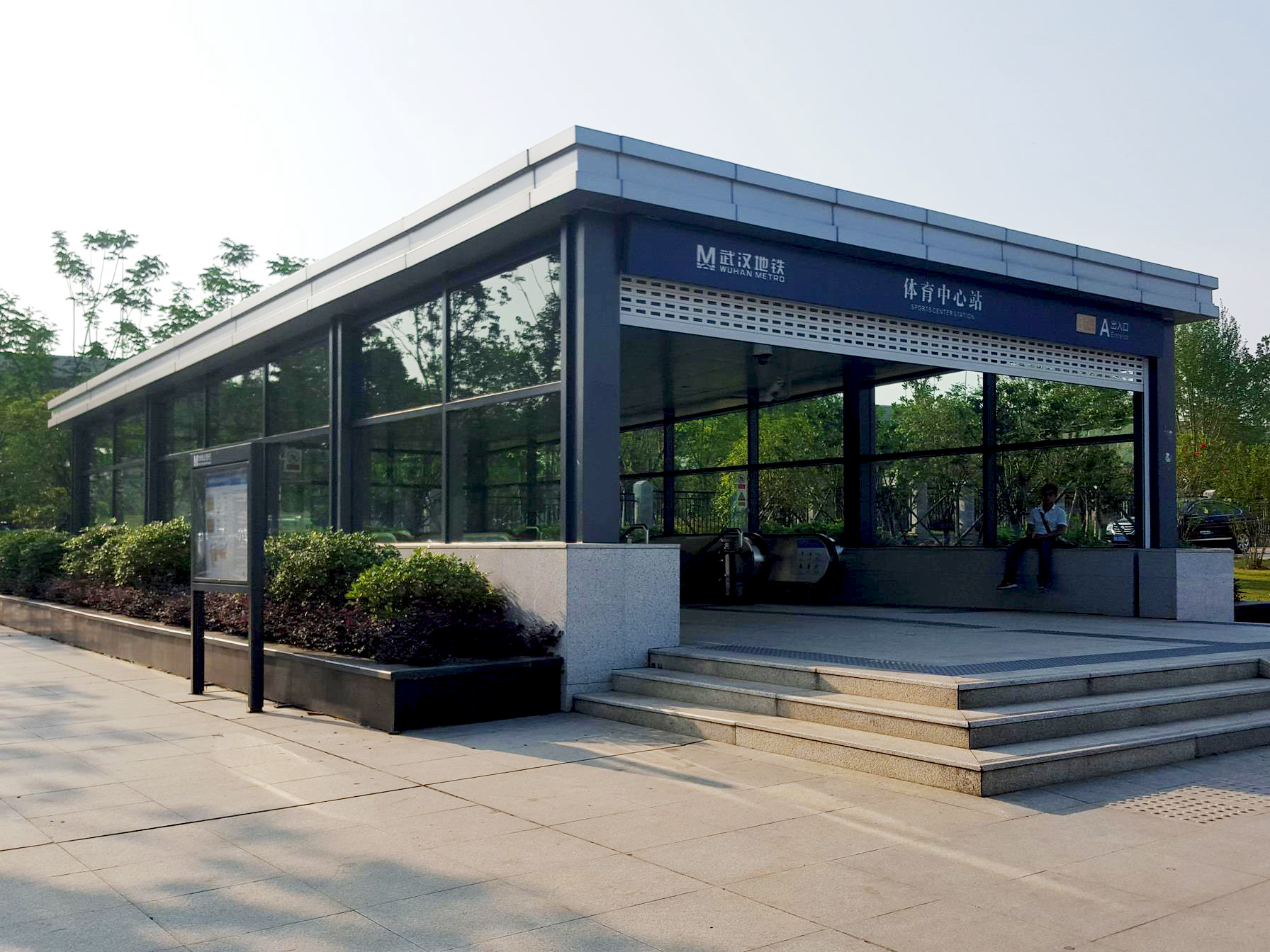
Entrance A

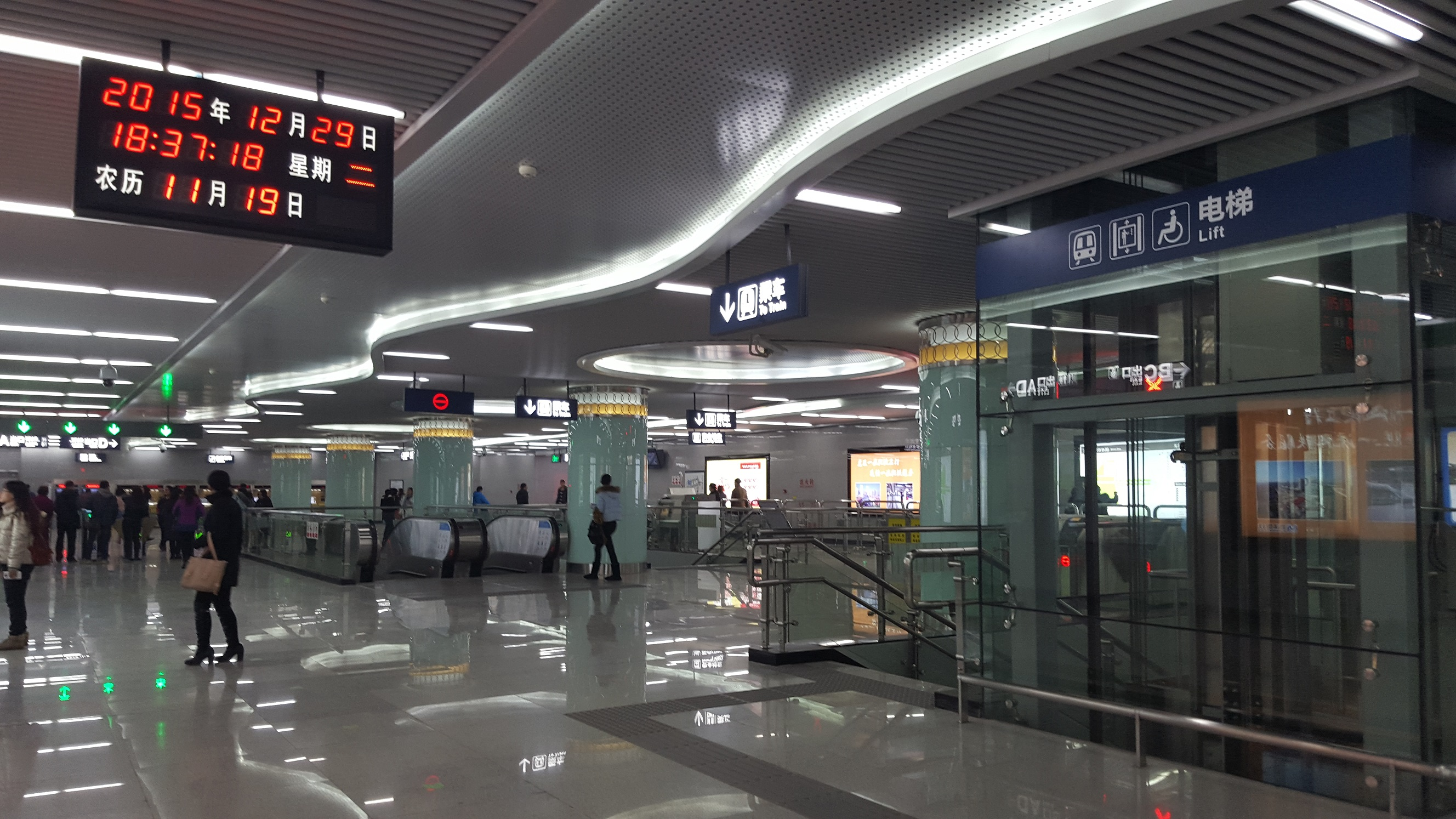
Concourse
