= Shuangdun station =

Metro station in Wuhan, China

Shuangdun 双墩 metro
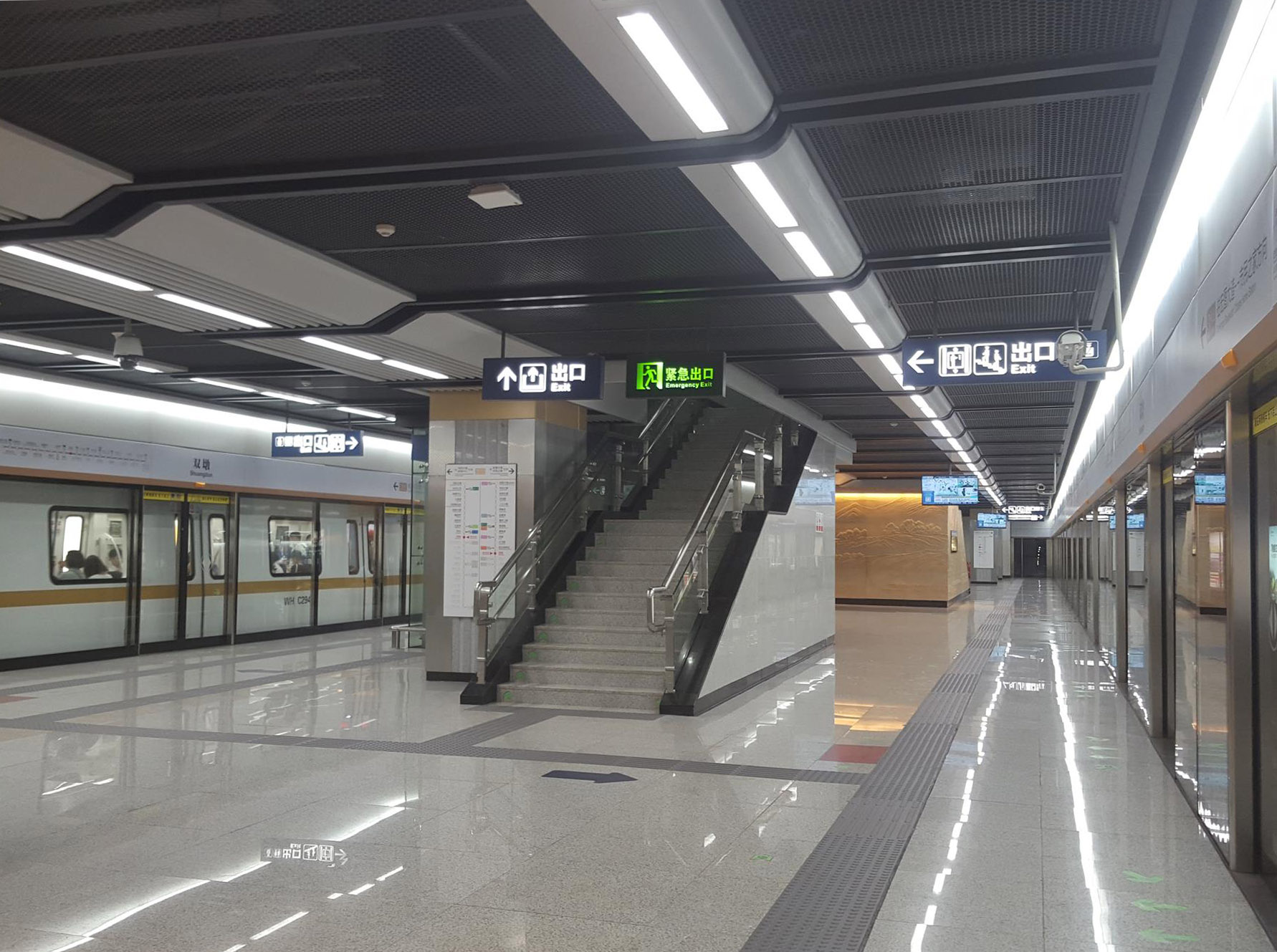

General information
- Location: Qiaokou District, Wuhan, Hubei; China
- Operator: Wuhan Metro Co., Ltd
- Lines: Line 3 Line 12
- Platforms: 4 (2 island platforms)

Construction
- Structure type: Underground

History
- Opened: December 28, 2015 (Line 3); October 29, 2026 (Line 12)

Services
| Preceding station | Wuhan Metro | Following station |
|---|---|---|
| Wuhan Business District towards Hongtu Boulevard | Line 3 | Zongguan towards Zhuanyang Boulevard |
| Hanxi Road South Outer Circle | Line 12 | Hanxi Road North Inner Circle |
Location

Shuangdun Station (Chinese: 双墩站) is a station of Line 3 and Line 12 of Wuhan Metro. It entered revenue service on December 28, 2015. It is located in Qiaokou District.

== Station layout ==
| G | Entrances and Exits | Exits A-C, E |
| B1 | Concourse | Faregates, Station Agent |
| B2 | Northbound | ← Line 3 towards Hongtu Boulevard (Wuhan Business District) |
| B2 | Island platform, doors will open on the left |
| B2 | Southbound | Line 3 towards Zhuanyang Boulevard (Zongguan) → |
| B3 | Outer Circle | ← Line 12 Outer Circle (Hanxi Road South) |
| B3 | Island platform, doors will open on the left |
| B3 | Inner Circle | Line 12 Inner Circle (Hanxi Road North) → |
