= Xingye Road station =

Metro station in Wuhan, China

Xingye Road 兴业路 metro

General information
- Location: Jiang'an District, Wuhan, Hubei; China
- Coordinates: 30.64555°N 114.29817°E
- Operator: Wuhan Metro Co., Ltd
- Lines: Line 3 Line 12
- Platforms: 4 (2 island platforms)

Construction
- Structure type: Underground

History
- Opened: December 28, 2015 (Line 3); October 29, 2026 (Line 12)

Services
Preceding station	Wuhan Metro	Following station
Houhu Boulevard towards Hongtu Boulevard	Line 3	Erqi Branch Road towards Zhuanyang Boulevard
Houhu 4th Road Outer Circle	Line 12	Baibuting Inner Circle
Location

Xingye Road Station (Chinese: 兴业路站) is a station of Line 3 and Line 12 of Wuhan Metro. It entered revenue service on December 28, 2015. It is located in Jiang'an District.

== Station layout ==
G	Entrances and Exits	Exits A-H, J, K
B1	Concourse	Faregates, Station Agent
B2	Northbound	← Line 3 towards Hongtu Boulevard (Houhu Boulevard)
B2	Island platform, doors will open on the left
B2	Southbound	Line 3 towards Zhuanyang Boulevard (Erqi Branch Road) →
B3	Outer Circle	← Line 12 Outer Circle (Houhu 4th Road)
B3	Island platform, doors will open on the left
B3	Inner Circle	Line 12 Inner Circle (Baibuting) →
