= Erqi Branch Road station =

Metro station in Wuhan, China

Coordinates: 30.6311°N 114.3023°E

Erqi Branch Road 二七小路
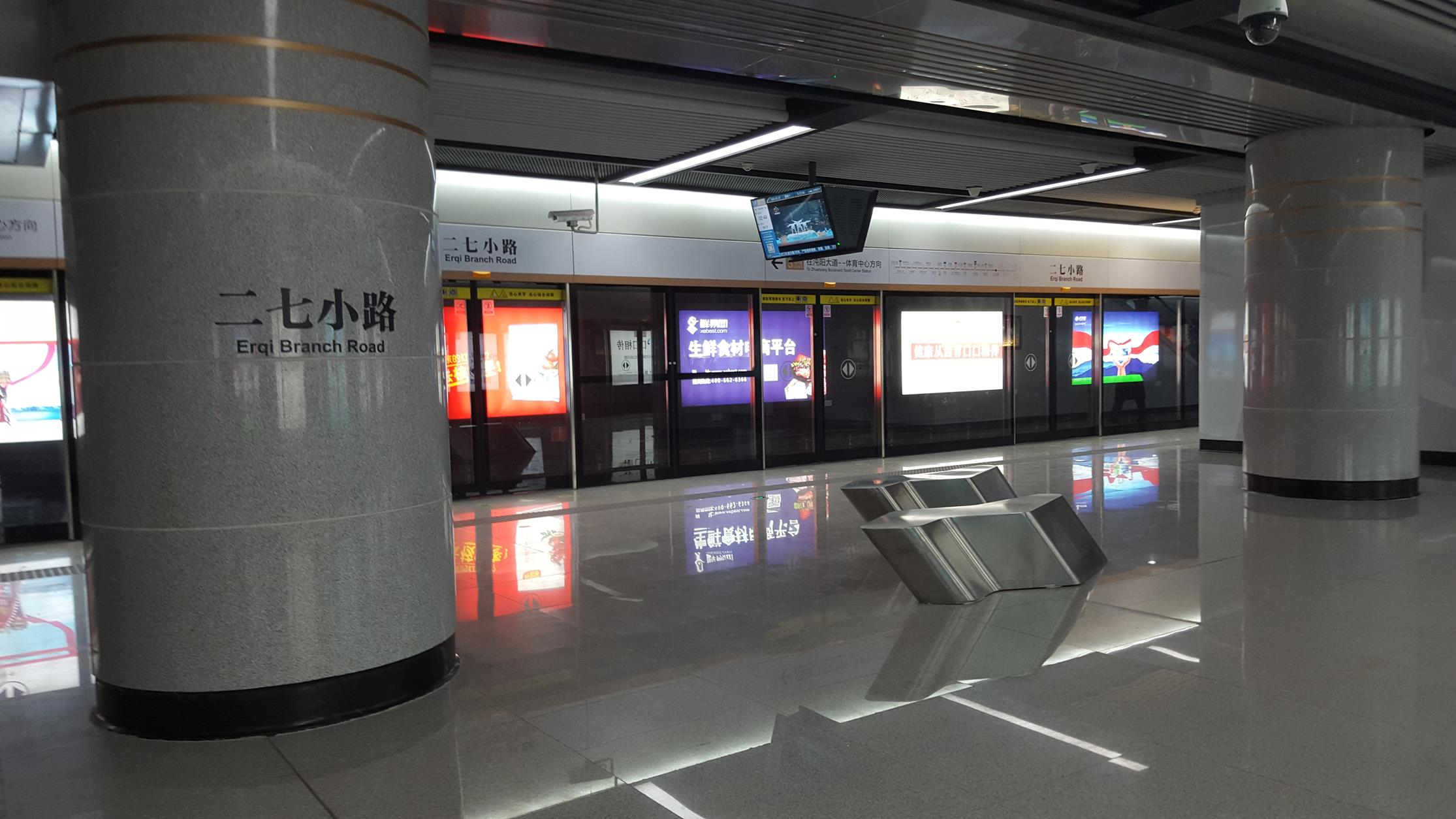

General information
- Location: Jiang'an District, Wuhan, Hubei; China
- Operated by: Wuhan Metro Co., Ltd
- Line: Line 3
- Platforms: 2 (1 island platform)

Construction
- Structure type: Underground

History
- Opened: December 28, 2015 (Line 3)

Services
| Preceding station | Wuhan Metro | Following station |
|---|---|---|
| Xingye Road towards Hongtu Boulevard | Line 3 | Luojiazhuang towards Zhuanyang Boulevard |
Location

Erqi Branch Road station (Chinese: 二七小路站) is a station of Line 3 of Wuhan Metro. It entered revenue service on December 28, 2015. It is located in Jiang'an District.

== Station layout ==
| G | Entrances and Exits | Exits A-D |
| B1 | Concourse | Faregates, Station Agent |
| B2 | Northbound | ← Line 3 towards Hongtu Boulevard (Xingye Road) |
| B2 | Island platform, doors will open on the left |
| B2 | Southbound | Line 3 towards Zhuanyang Boulevard (Luojiazhuang) → |

== Gallery ==
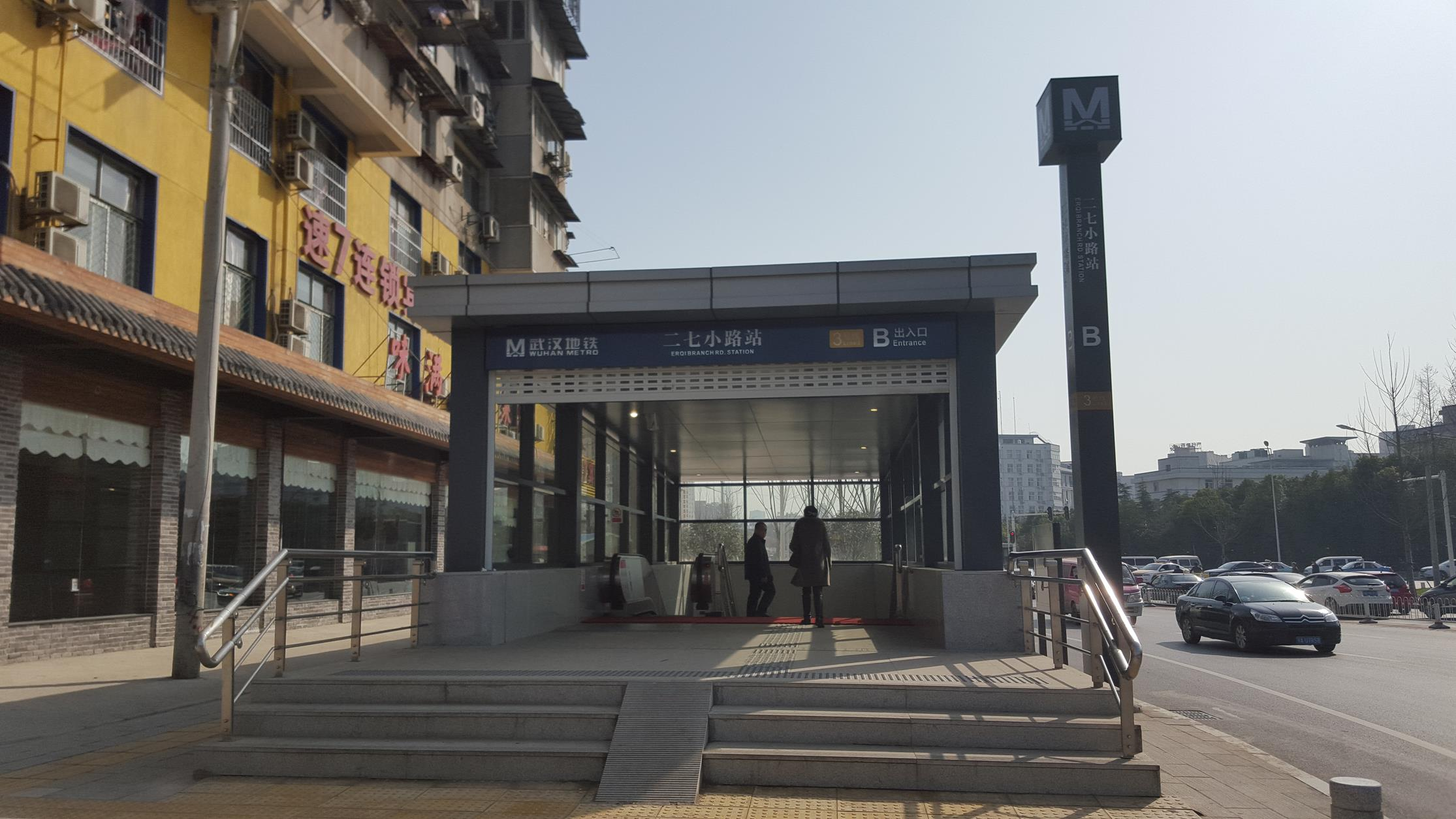
Entrance B

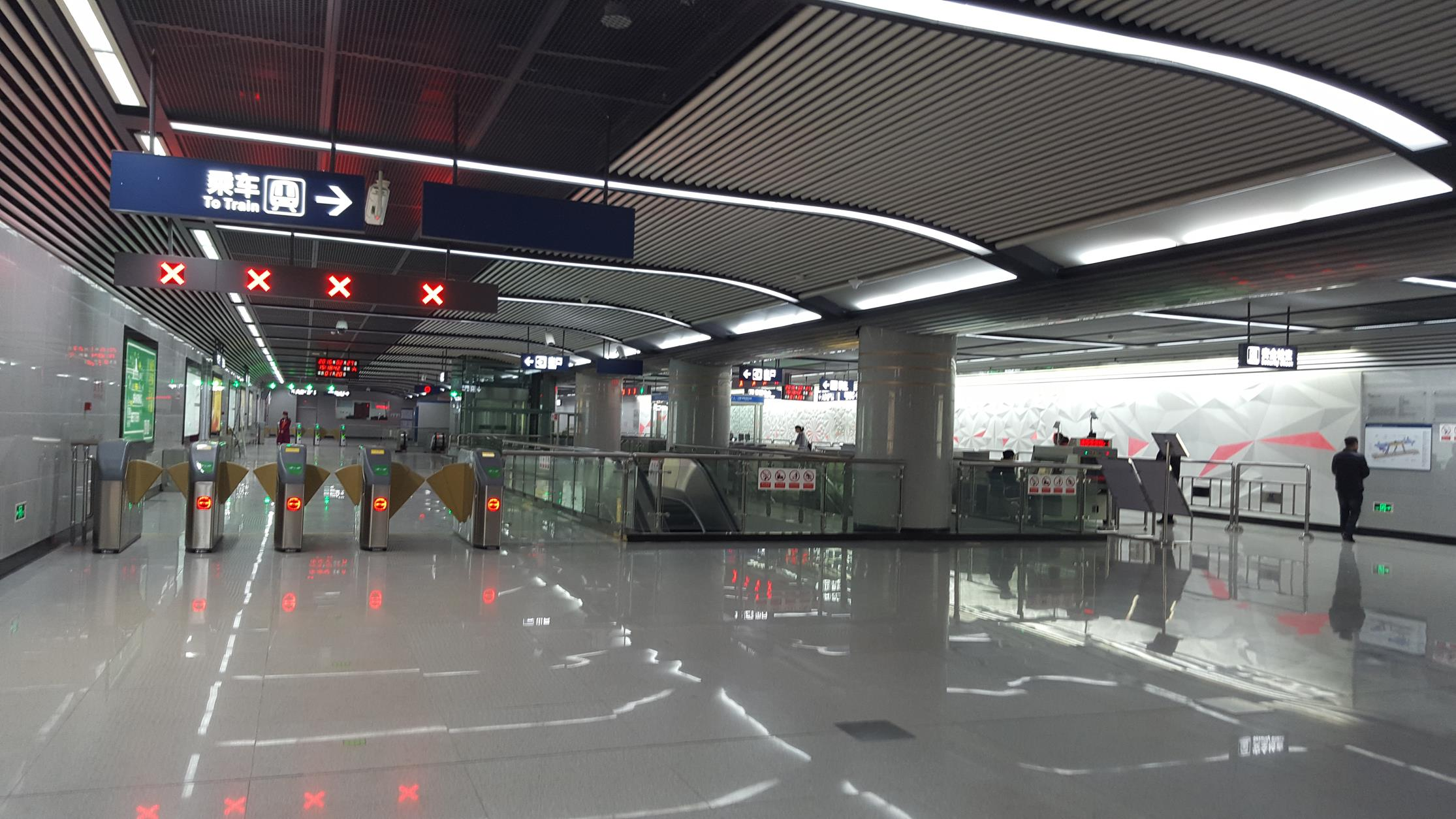
Concourse
