= Lingjiaohu station =

Metro station in Wuhan, China

Lingjiaohu 菱角湖 metro

General information
- Location: Jianghan District, Wuhan, Hubei; China
- Operated by: Wuhan Metro Co., Ltd
- Line: Line 3
- Platforms: 2 (1 island platform)

Construction
- Structure type: Underground

History
- Opened: December 28, 2015 (Line 3)

Services
Preceding station	Wuhan Metro	Following station
Xianggang Road towards Hongtu Boulevard	Line 3	Fanhu towards Zhuanyang Boulevard
Location

Lingjiaohu Station (Chinese: 菱角湖站) is a station of Line 3 of Wuhan Metro. It entered revenue service on December 28, 2015. It is located in Jianghan District.

== Station layout ==
G	Entrances and Exits	Exits A-D
B1	Concourse	Faregates, Station Agent
B2	Northbound	← Line 3 towards Hongtu Boulevard (Xianggang Road)
B2	Island platform, doors will open on the left
B2	Southbound	Line 3 towards Zhuanyang Boulevard (Fanhu) →
