= Citizens Home station =

Metro station in Wuhan, China

Coordinates: 30.6635°N 114.2919°E

Citizens Home 市民之家
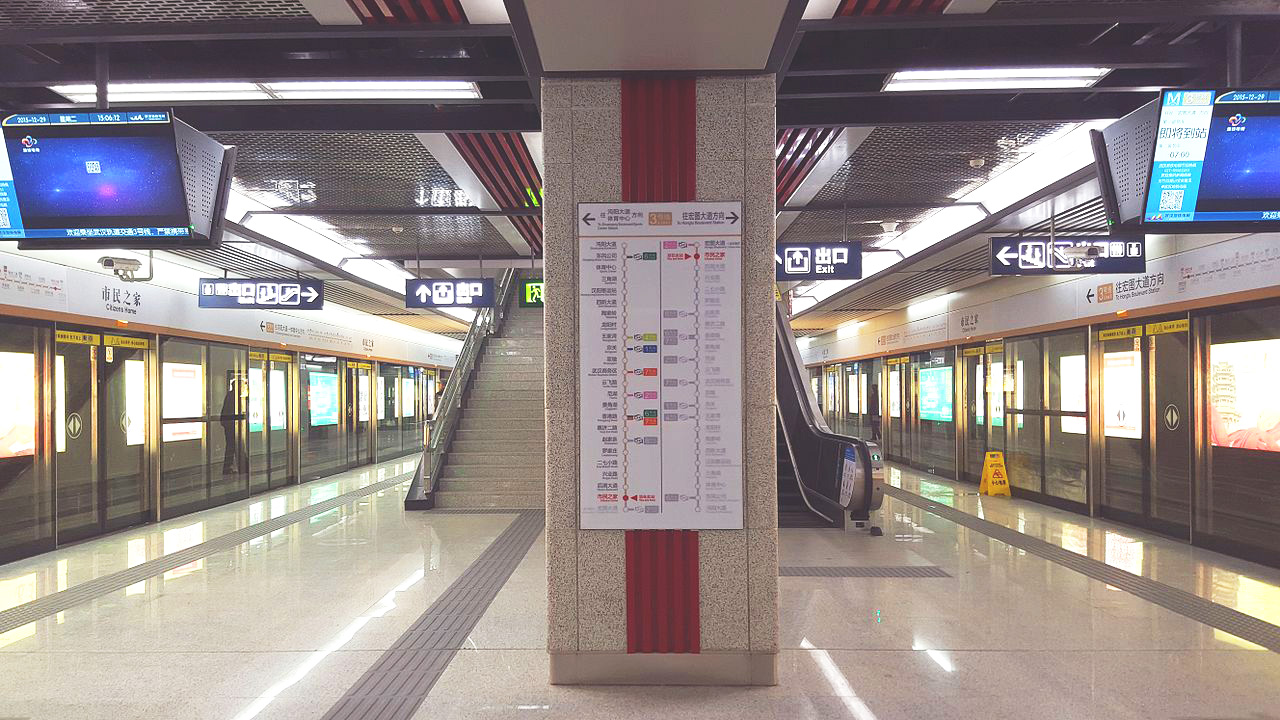

General information
- Location: Jiang'an District, Wuhan, Hubei; China
- Operated by: Wuhan Metro Co., Ltd
- Line: Line 3
- Platforms: 2 (1 island platform)

Construction
- Structure type: Underground

History
- Opened: December 28, 2015

Services
Preceding station	Wuhan Metro	Following station
Hongtu Boulevard Terminus	Line 3	Houhu Boulevard towards Zhuanyang Boulevard
Location

Citizens Home Station (Chinese: 市民之家站) is a station of Line 3 of Wuhan Metro. It entered revenue service on December 28, 2015. It is located in Jiang'an District. This station is near the Citizens Home of Wuhan.

== Station layout ==
G	Entrances and Exits	Exits A, B, D-G
B1	Concourse	Faregates, Station Agent
B2	Northbound	← Line 3 towards Hongtu Boulevard (Terminus)
B2	Island platform, doors will open on the left
B2	Southbound	Line 3 towards Zhuanyang Boulevard (Houhu Boulevard) →

== Gallery ==
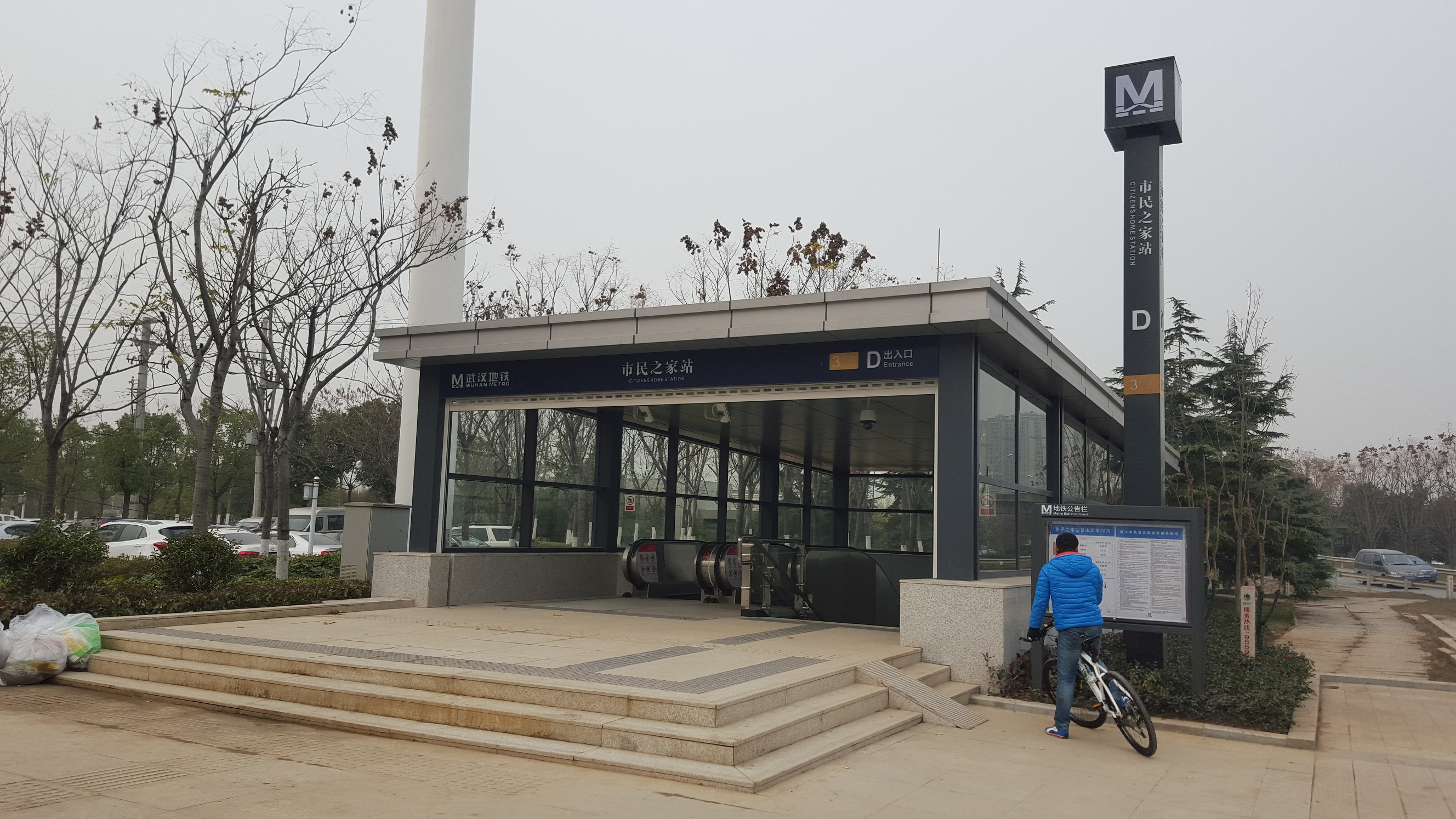
Entrance D

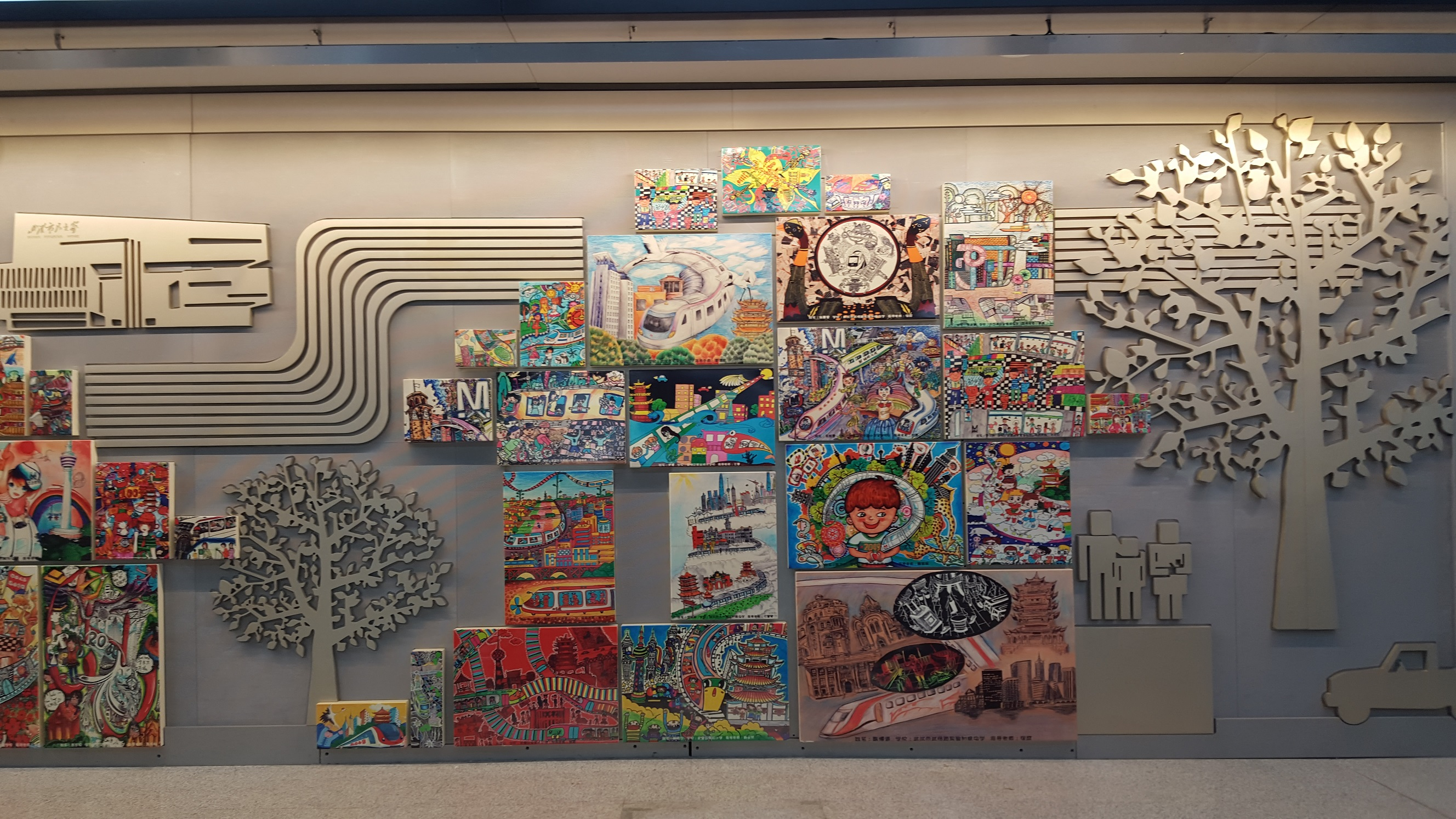
Art Wall
