= Hanyang County =

Hanyang (漢陽) may refer to

- 漢陽郡 in now Tianshui, Gansu
- 漢陽縣 in now Caidian, Wuhan, Hubei
