= Line 3 (Wuhan Metro) =

Line of Wuhan Metro

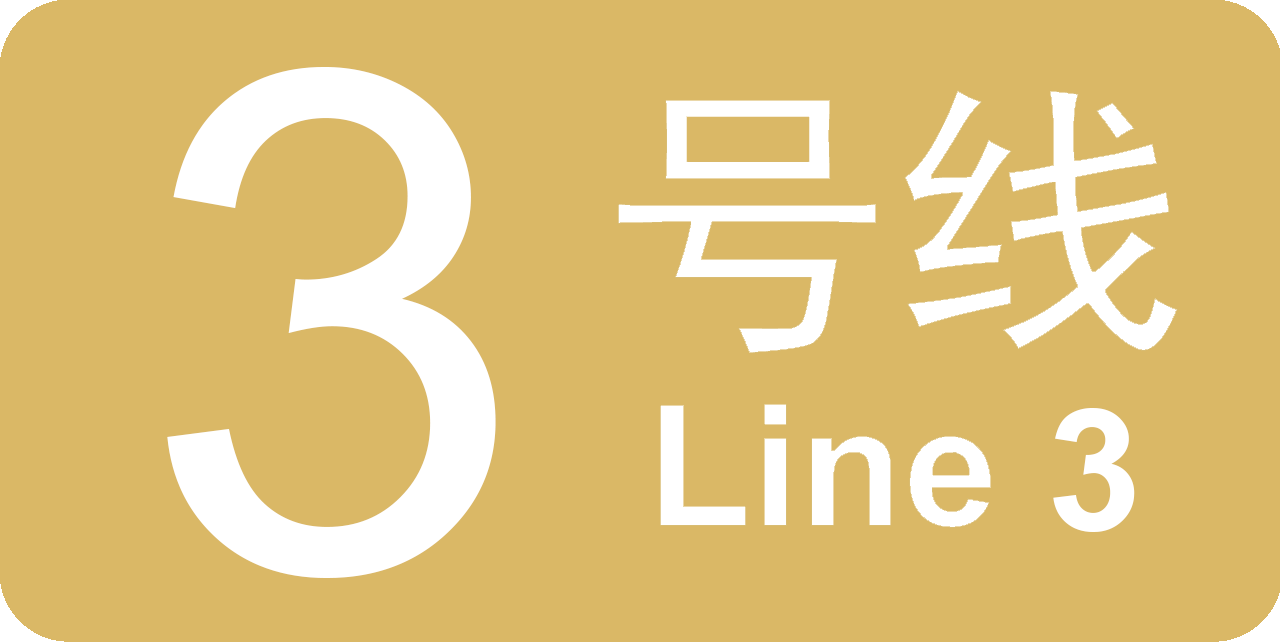

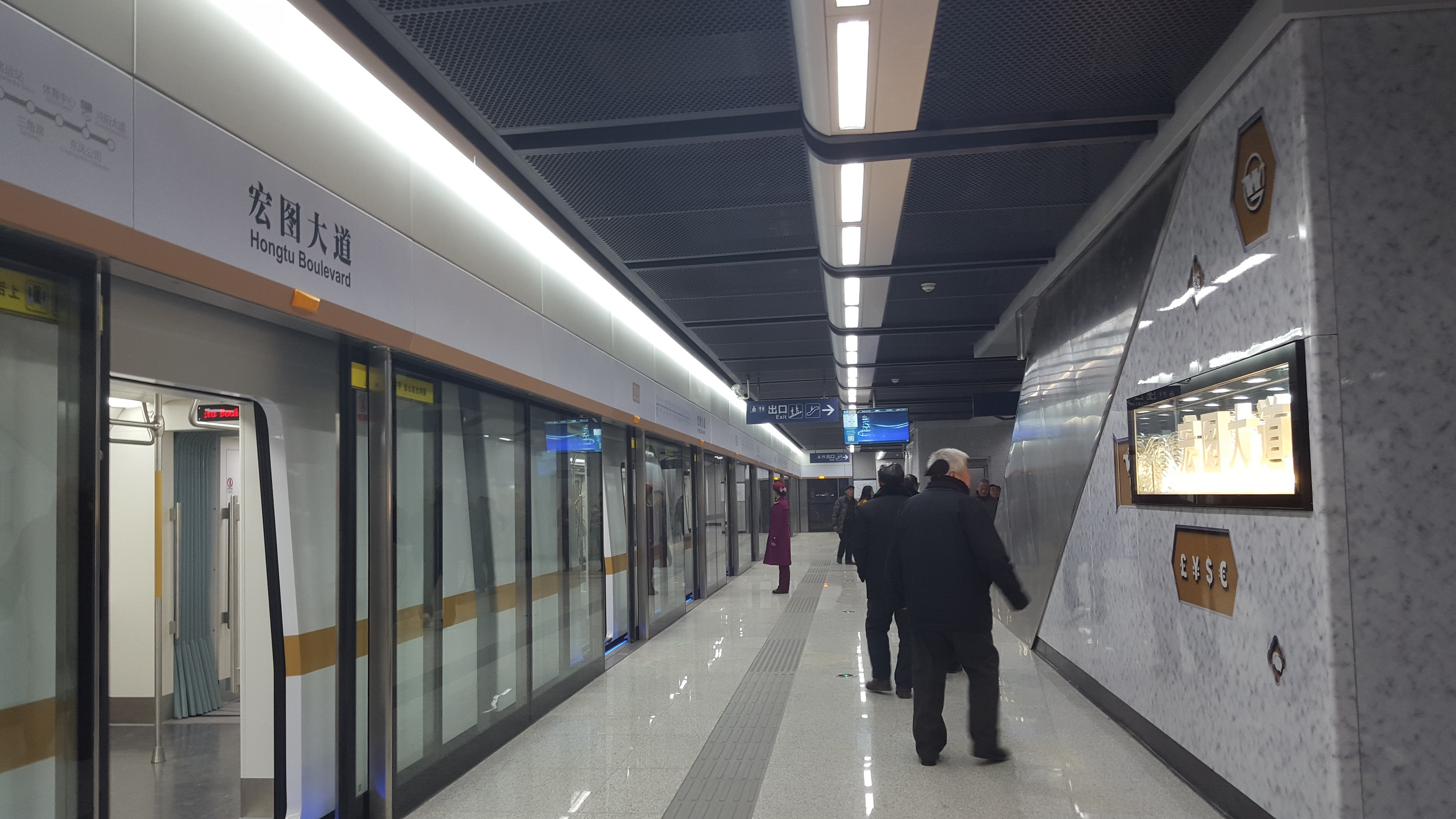
- A train at Hongtu Boulevard station in December 2015

Overview
- Status: Operating
- Owner: Government of Wuhan
- Locale: Wuhan, Hubei
- Termini: Hongtu Boulevard; Zhuanyang Boulevard
- Stations: 24

Service
- Type: Rapid transit
- System: Wuhan Metro
- Services: 1
- Operator: Wuhan Metro Group Co., Ltd.
- Rolling stock: CRRC Changchun Railway Vehicles Chinese Type B

History
- Opened: 28 December 2015; 10 years ago

Technical
- Line length: 33.2 km (20.63 mi)
- Num of tracks: 2
- Character: Underground
- Track gauge: 1,435 mm (4 ft 8 1/2 in)
Route map

The Line 3 of Wuhan Metro (Chinese: 武汉地铁三号线) is a metro line in Wuhan. This line crosses five districts of Wuhan: Jiang'an District, Jianghan District, Qiaokou District, Hanyang District and Caidian District (Wuhan Economic-Technological Zone, WEDZ), and is the first line to cross the Han River. It started operation on December 28, 2015.

== History ==
On February 23, 2012, National Development and Reform Commission approved all construction of Line 3 and construction started on March 31. All tunnels of Line 3 were finished on October 8, 2015, and all tracks were finished on October 28, 2015. The line started operation on December 28, 2015.

Segment	Commencement	Length	Station(s)	Name
Zhuanyang Boulevard — Hongtu Boulevard	28 December 2015	29.660 km (18.43 mi)	24	Phase 1

== Stations ==
Station name		Connections	Distance km		Location
English	Chinese	Connections	Distance km		Location
Zhuanyang Boulevard	沌阳大道	Auto-city Tram (via Chelun Square)	0.000	0.000	Hannan
Dongfeng Motor Corporation	东风公司	6	1.449	1.449	Caidian
Sports Center	体育中心		0.842	2.291	Caidian
Sanjiaohu	三角湖		1.454	3.745	Caidian
Hanyang Long-Distance Bus Station	汉阳客运站		1.563	5.308	Caidian
Sixin Boulevard	四新大道		0.928	6.236	Caidian
Taojialing	陶家岭		1.359	7.595	Hanyang
Longyangcun	龙阳村		0.906	8.501	Hanyang
Wangjiawan	王家湾	4	1.107	9.608	Hanyang
Zongguan	宗关	1	2.531	12.139	Qiaokou
Shuangdun	双墩	12	0.982	13.121	Qiaokou
Wuhan Business District	武汉商务区	7	1.825	14.946	Jianghan
Yunfei Road	云飞路		1.227	16.173	Jianghan
Fanhu	范湖	2	0.885	17.058	Jianghan
Lingjiaohu	菱角湖		1.676	18.734	Jianghan
Xianggang Road	香港路	6 7	0.932	19.666	Jiang'an
Huiji 2nd Road	惠济二路		0.934	20.600	Jiang'an
Zhaojiatiao	赵家条	8	0.896	21.496	Jiang'an
Luojiazhuang	罗家庄		0.882	22.378	Jiang'an
Erqi Branch Road	二七小路		0.759	23.137	Jiang'an
Xingye Road	兴业路	12	1.253	24.390	Jiang'an
Houhu Boulevard	后湖大道	Yangluo	1.181	25.571	Jiang'an
Citizens Home	市民之家		1.667	27.238	Jiang'an
Hongtu Boulevard	宏图大道	2 8	2.422	29.660	Jiang'an

== Rolling stock ==
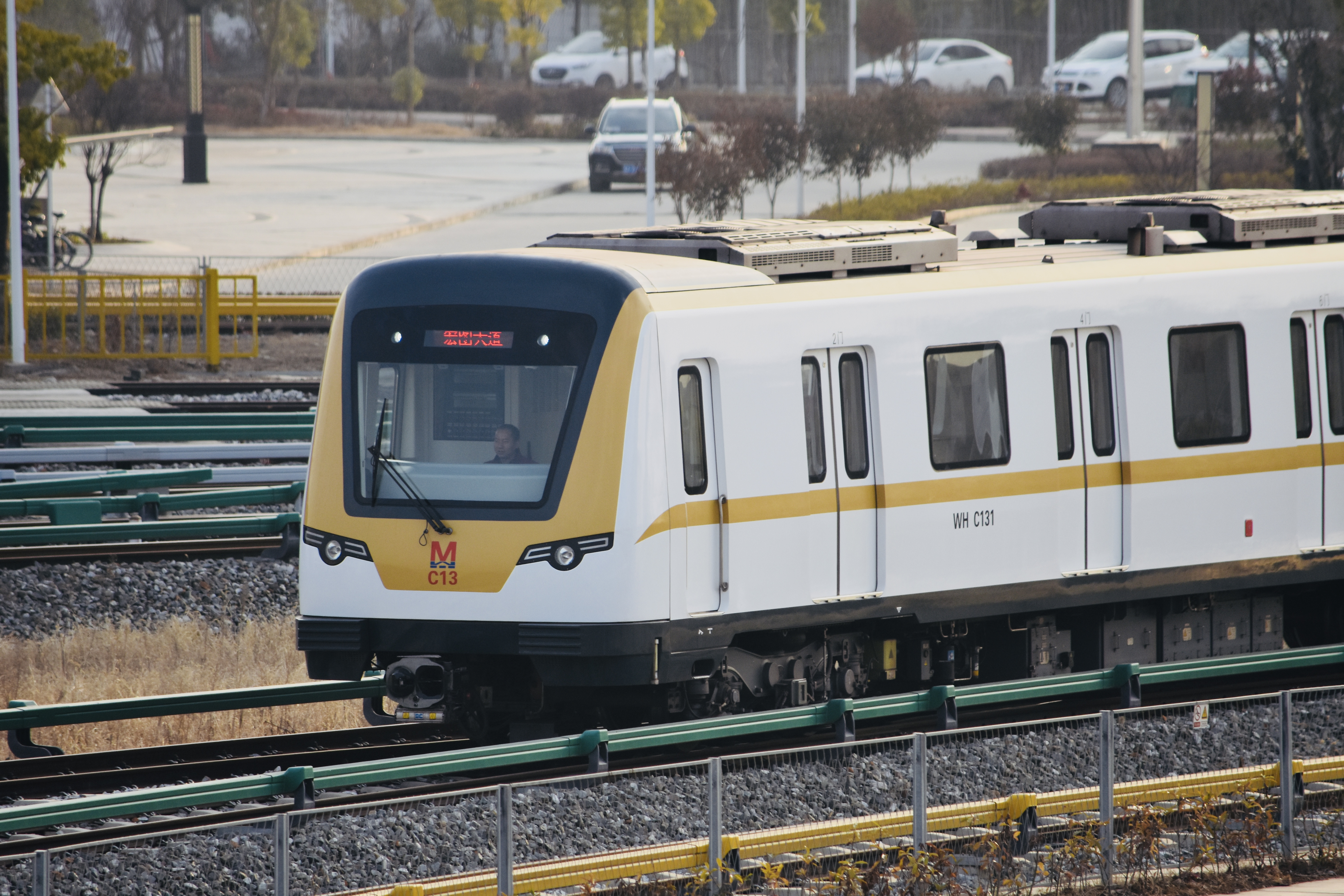
Line 3 train

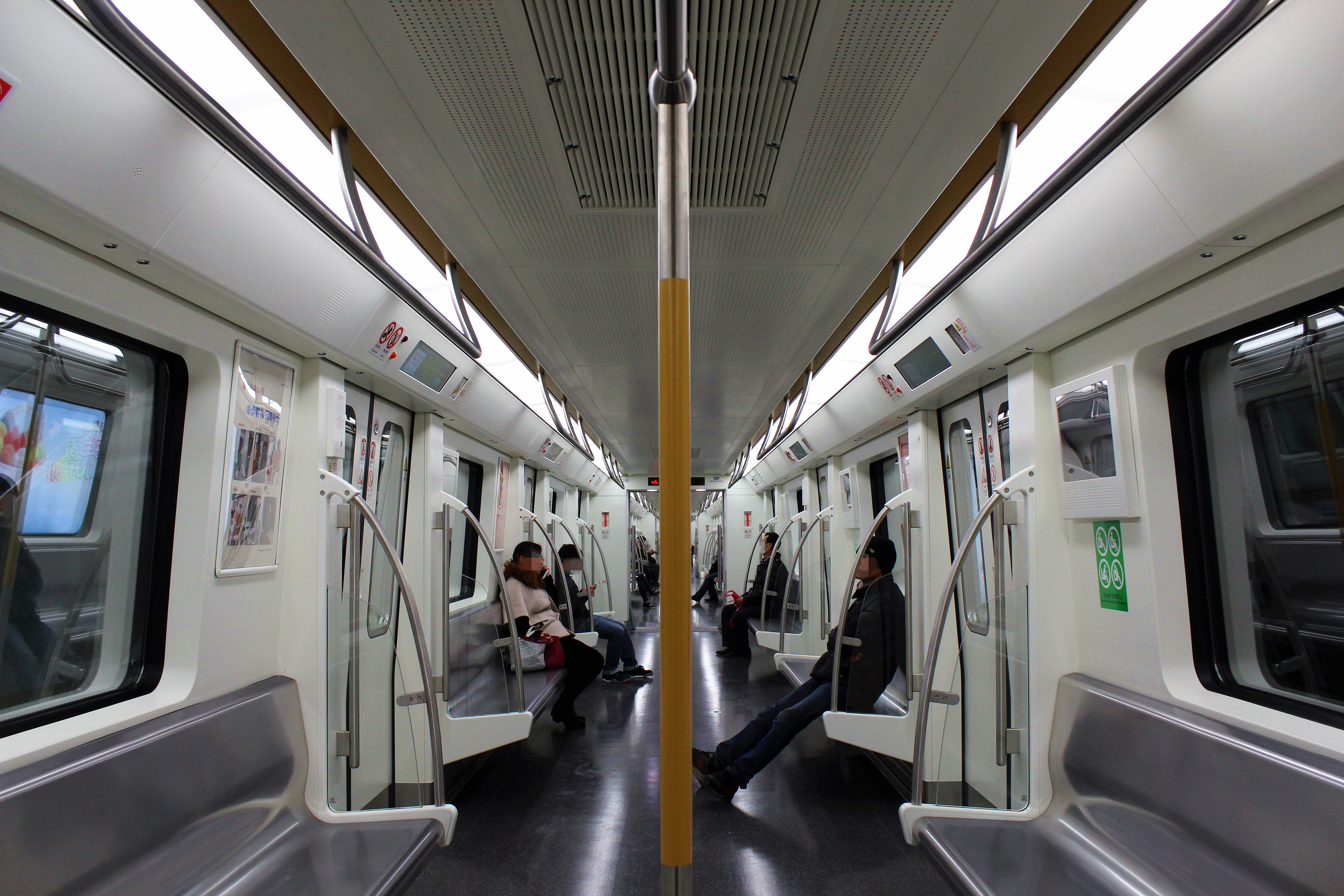
Inside the train

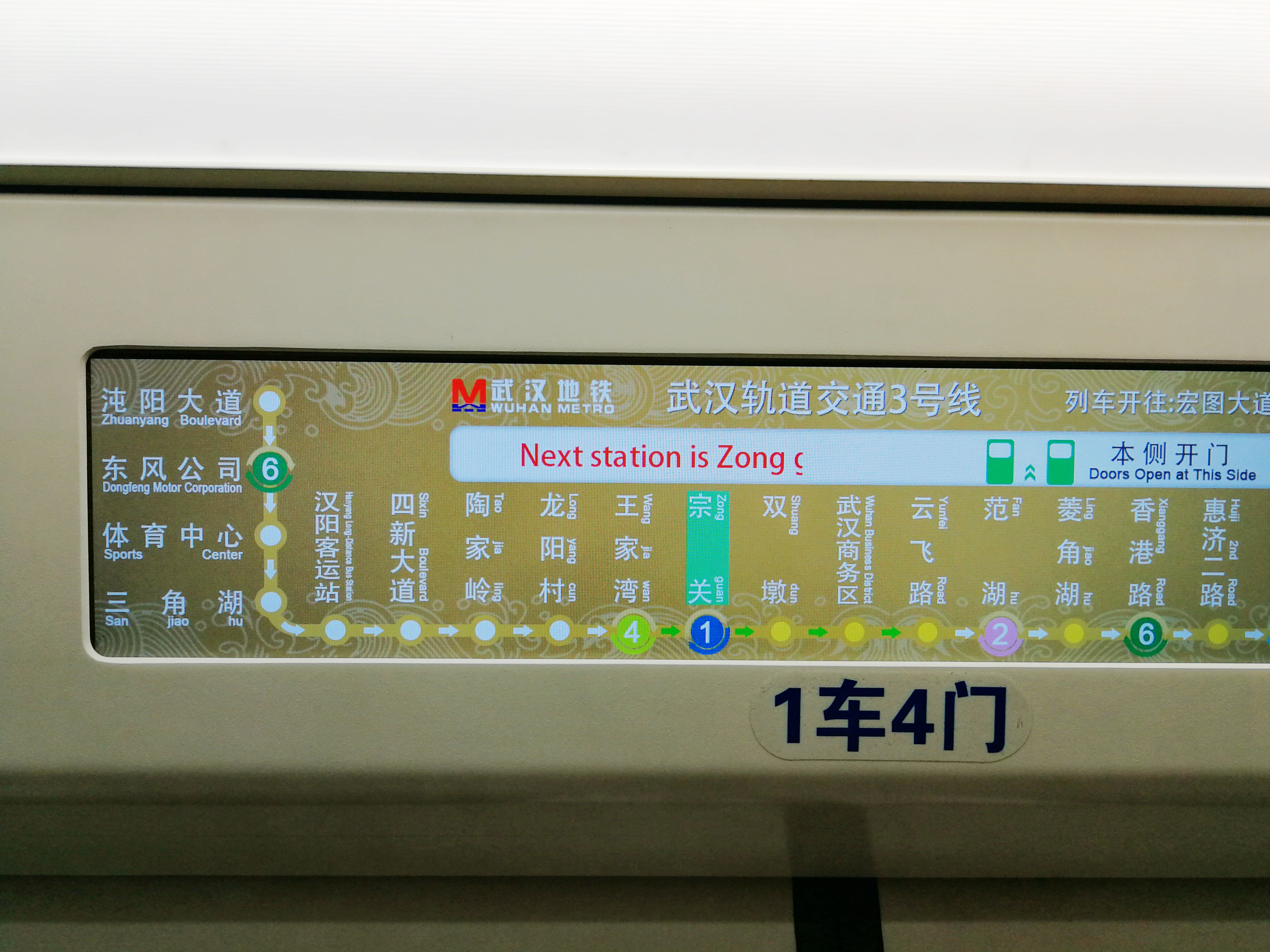
Interior LCD

Type	Time of manufacturing	Sets	Assembly	Notes
Type B	2015	29		Manufactured by CRRC Changchun Railway Vehicles.

The first train of Line 3 arrived on March 25, 2015 from CRRC Changchun Railway Vehicles. A further order of 19 six-car sets was made in 2019.

== Incidents ==
On August 2, 2020, maintenance equipment breached safety limits and shattered a row of platform doors in Wuhan Business District station. No injuries were reported.
