= Hannan, Wuhan =

Hannan 汉南区
- District
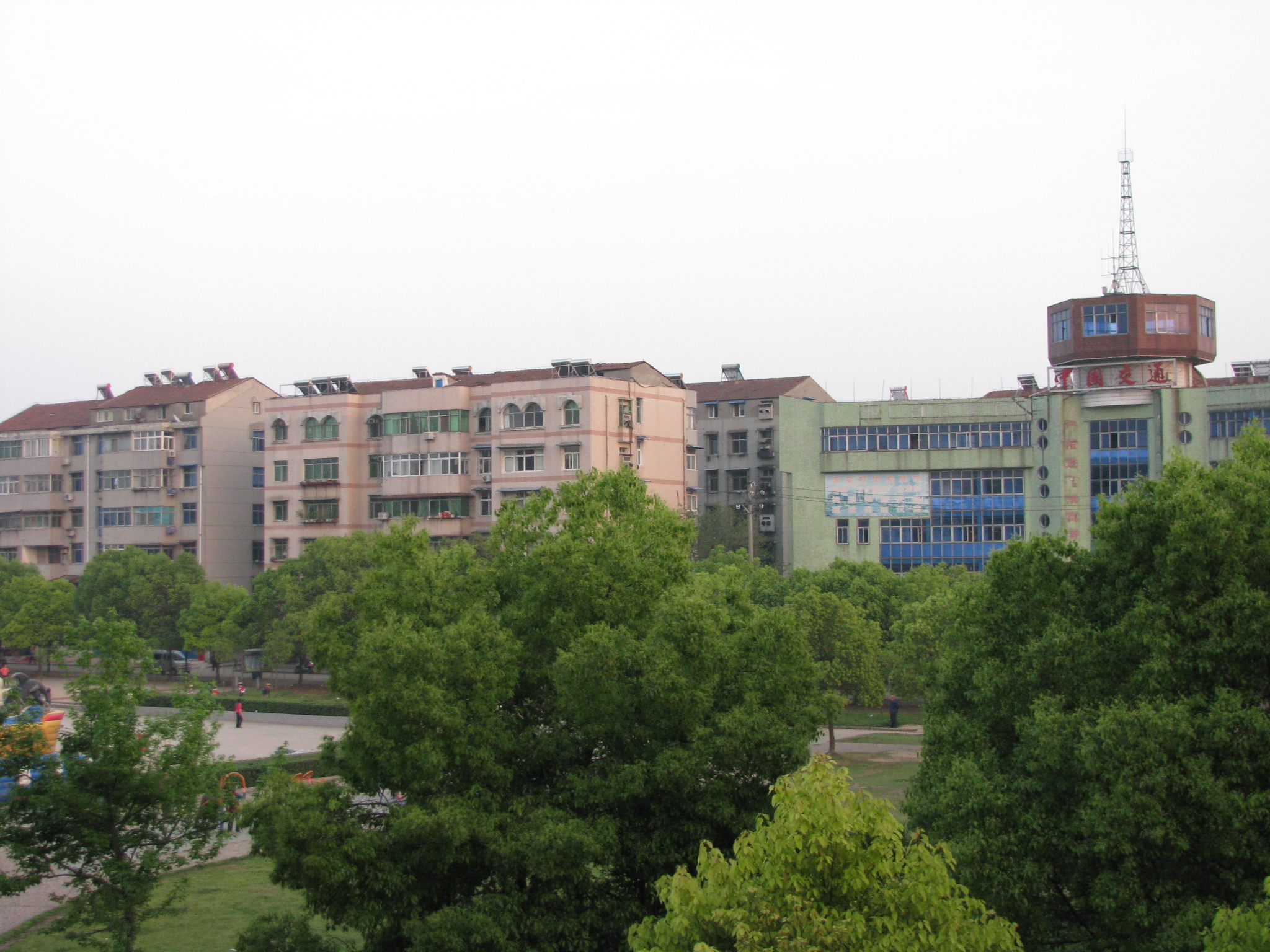
- Hannan Shamao Square 汉南区纱帽广场
- Interactive map of Hannan
- Location in Hubei
- Coordinates: 30°18′37″N 114°04′55″E
- Country: People's Republic of China
- Province: Hubei
- Sub-provincial city: Wuhan
- Subdistricts: 4

Area
  - Total: 287.70 km^{2} (111.08 sq mi)

Population (2020)
  - Total: 145,103
  - Density: 504.36/km^{2} (1,306.3/sq mi)
- Time zone: UTC+8 (China Standard)
- Website: http://www.wedz.gov.cn/

Hannan District (Chinese: 汉南区; pinyin: Hànnán Qū) is one of 13 urban districts of the prefecture-level city of Wuhan, the capital of Hubei Province, China. It is the least-populous of Wuhan's districts, and is situated on the northern (left) bank of the Yangtze River. It borders the districts of Caidian to the north and Jiangxia to the east across the Yangtze, as well as the prefecture-level cities of Xianning and Jingzhou (for a sliver) to the south; it also borders the directly administered county-level city of Xiantao to the west.

== Geography ==
=== Administrative districts ===
In 2006, Dengnan Town (邓南镇) was made into Dengnan Subdistrict. Since this change, Hannan District has administered four subdistricts:

Name	Chinese (S)	Hanyu Pinyin
Shamao Subdistrict	纱帽街道	Shāmào Jiēdào
Dongjing Subdistrict	东荆街道	Dōngjīng Jiēdào
Xiangkou Subdistrict	湘口街道	Xiāngkǒu Jiēdào
Dengnan Subdistrict	邓南街道	Dèngnán Jiēdào

== Transportation ==
Wuhan Metro Line 3 starts from Zhuanyang Boulevard station in the district. Line 16 serves the district.
