= Caidian, Wuhan =

Caidian 蔡甸区
- District
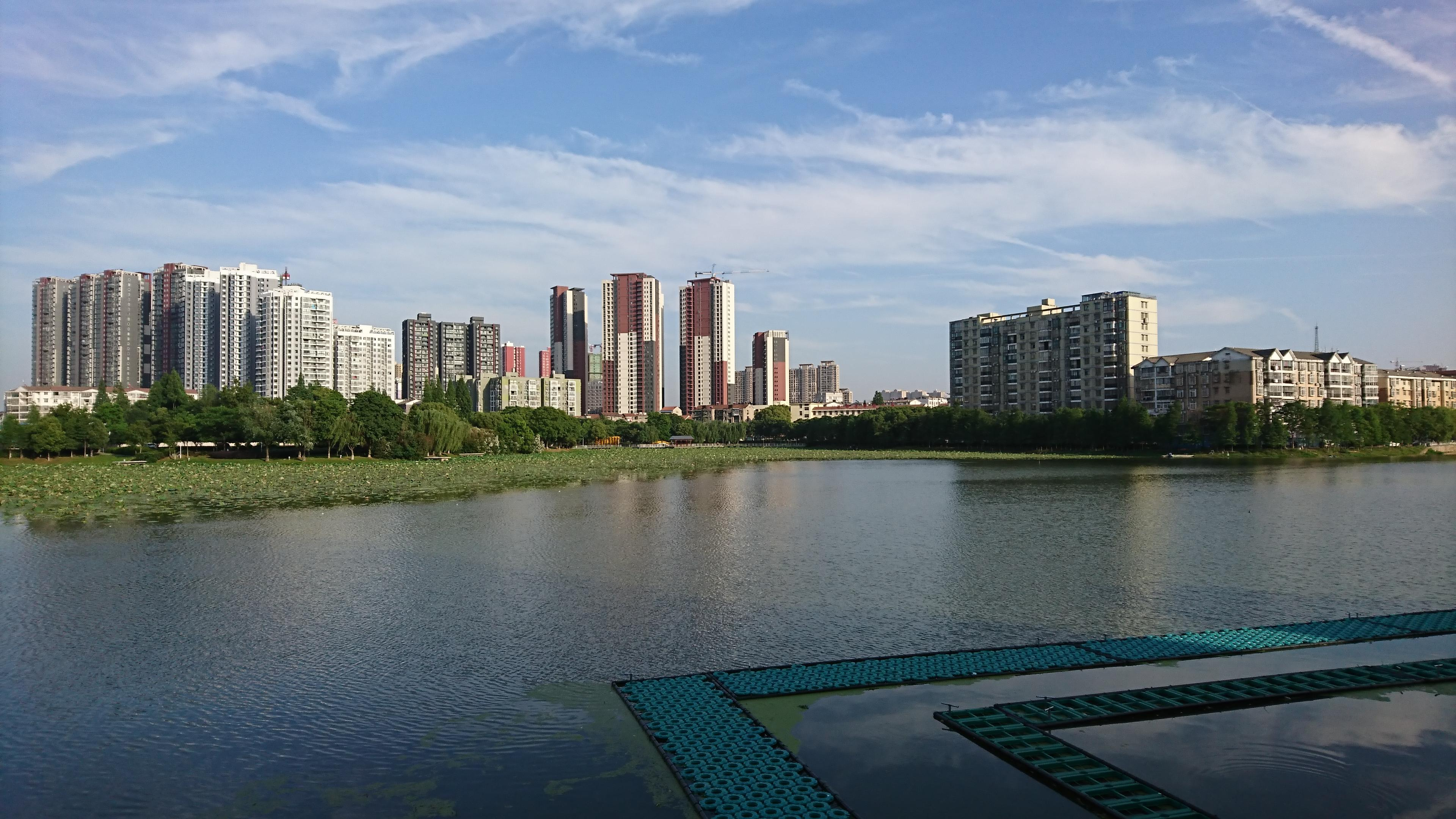
- Lianhua Lake (Lotus Lake) in Caidian District
- Interactive map of Caidian
- Location in Hubei
- Coordinates: 30°35′52″N 114°01′30″E
- Country: People's Republic of China
- Province: Hubei
- Sub-provincial city: Wuhan
- Township-level (4th) subdivisions: 12

Area
  - Total: 1,108.10 km^{2} (427.84 sq mi)

Population (2020)
  - Total: 930,818
  - Density: 371/km^{2} (960/sq mi)
- Time zone: UTC+8 (China Standard)
- Postal code: 4301XX
- Website: www.caidian.gov.cn

Caidian District (Chinese: 蔡甸区; pinyin: Càidiàn Qū) is one of 13 urban districts that constitute the prefecture-level city of Wuhan, the capital of Hubei Province, China, forming part of the city's southwestern suburbs and situated on the northwestern (left) bank of the Yangtze River. On the left bank it borders the districts of Dongxihu to the north, Hanyang to the northeast, and Hannan to the south; on the opposite bank, Jiangxia and Hongshan. It also borders Xiaogan to the northwest and Xiantao to the southwest.

== Introduction ==
The District of Caidian is situated along a tributary of the Yangtze river. There are karaoke bars, open markets and swathes of local shops from start-ups to well known chains. There is a main supermarket in the high street and a few Western-style bakeries. The town is fast developing due to globalization. There are numerous hospitals and schools in the town. A local specialty is hot, spicy beef noodles, which is boiled in large cauldrons. Some residents achieve notable academic success, attending local universities within Wuhan, such as Wuhan university, a top ten university in China.

Lotus grows in the small lakes within the towns and are managed by government workers. Chinese New Year is a popular time for the town with many fireworks being sold and lit. Bus services to Wuhan city are available.

== Geography ==
The eastern half of the district is dominated by urban land. There are scattered patches of forest throughout the district. The southern tip of the district has a large rural settlement. There is a thin forest corridor that stretches from the northern part of the district to the southern tip. This is broken up by water, and in the center, urban land. The district is broken up by bodies of waters and rivers. Most of the land is arable land for farming.

=== Administrative Divisions ===
Caidian District implemented many changes in administrative division organization after the 2010 Census. Among the changes, Suohe Town has become Suohe Subdistrict. Caidian District currently administers eight subdistricts, two administrative committees, one township and one farm:

Name	Chinese (S)	Hanyu Pinyin
Caidian Subdistrict	蔡甸街道	Càidiàn Jiēdào
Zhashan Subdistrict	奓山街道	Zhāshān Jiēdào
Yong'an Subdistrict	永安街道	Yǒng'ān Jiēdào
Zhuru Subdistrict	侏儒街道	Zhūrú Jiēdào
Daji Subdistrict	大集街道	Dàjí Jiēdào
Zhangwan Subdistrict	张湾街道	Zhāngwān Jiēdào
Suohe Subdistrict	索河街道	Suǒhé Jiēdào
Yuxian Subdistrict	玉贤街道	Yùxián Jiēdào
Hongbei Agricultural Model Administrative Committee	洪北农业示范区管委会	Hóngběi Nóngyè Shīfàn Qū Guǎnwěihuì
Chenggong Administrative Committee	成功管委会	Chénggōng Guǎnwěihuì
Xiaosi Township	消泗乡	Xiāosì Xiāng
Tonghu Farm	桐湖农场	Tónghú Nóngchǎng

== History ==
Some local residents remember when the Japanese marched through Caidian town. Anti-Japanese television shows are played on television to this day.

Suohe Town

This town contains a weaving mill.

Lakes

The following lakes are present in the district:

- Houguan lake

Recently a walkway was built across the lake to improve accessibility. Housing developers are banned from building within 50 meters of this structure.

- Xiaozha lake
- Guanlian lake
- Chenhu lake
- Wanjia lake
- Zhushan lake

Shimao Carnival Business Center Theme Park

This will be the largest indoor theme park in China, and is set to be complete by 2015. It has cost $0.7 billion and stretches over 8 million square meters. It will be located by Houguan Lake. It will have the following themes:

Ice Age, Heaven Town, Warriors Forest, Rainbow Continent, and DreamWorks

Crimes Against Humanity

In 2000 it was reported in Caidian that local officials drowned a baby. The baby was held and submerged in the water of a paddy field. The baby was then thrown in a toilet.

Bee Mystery

On 5 June 2014 it was discovered that 2.4 million bees had died in the district. The cause of this was a mystery, though it was suspected that the cause was pesticides.

Dead Fish

100,000 kilos of fish perished at a fish farm in Caidian in 2007. The cause of this was said to be blue-green algae.

Tree planting

Charities coordinate with local schools to plant trees in the district.

Popular Culture

Part of the book 'A Corpse's Transmutation' is set in Caidian, where an old man and his son own an inn.

== Climate ==
Climate data for Caidian, elevation 24 m (79 ft), (1991–2020 normals, extremes 1981–present)
Month	Jan	Feb	Mar	Apr	May	Jun	Jul	Aug	Sep	Oct	Nov	Dec	Year
Record high °C (°F)	21.2 (70.2)	29.2 (84.6)	33.2 (91.8)	33.7 (92.7)	36.2 (97.2)	36.7 (98.1)	38.7 (101.7)	39.6 (103.3)	37.6 (99.7)	34.3 (93.7)	30.7 (87.3)	23.0 (73.4)	39.6 (103.3)
Mean daily maximum °C (°F)	8.3 (46.9)	11.4 (52.5)	16.3 (61.3)	22.7 (72.9)	27.3 (81.1)	30.4 (86.7)	33.2 (91.8)	32.8 (91.0)	28.9 (84.0)	23.3 (73.9)	17.1 (62.8)	10.8 (51.4)	21.9 (71.4)
Daily mean °C (°F)	4.1 (39.4)	7.0 (44.6)	11.6 (52.9)	17.8 (64.0)	22.7 (72.9)	26.3 (79.3)	29.3 (84.7)	28.6 (83.5)	24.2 (75.6)	18.5 (65.3)	12.0 (53.6)	6.5 (43.7)	17.4 (63.3)
Mean daily minimum °C (°F)	1.0 (33.8)	3.6 (38.5)	7.9 (46.2)	13.7 (56.7)	18.8 (65.8)	23.0 (73.4)	26.2 (79.2)	25.4 (77.7)	20.7 (69.3)	14.9 (58.8)	8.4 (47.1)	3.3 (37.9)	13.9 (57.0)
Record low °C (°F)	−11.2 (11.8)	−6.5 (20.3)	−2.2 (28.0)	1.7 (35.1)	8.4 (47.1)	12.8 (55.0)	19.1 (66.4)	15.4 (59.7)	10.5 (50.9)	2.6 (36.7)	−2.9 (26.8)	−9.2 (15.4)	−11.2 (11.8)
Average precipitation mm (inches)	52.5 (2.07)	66.4 (2.61)	91.0 (3.58)	137.5 (5.41)	160.6 (6.32)	212.9 (8.38)	255.5 (10.06)	106.3 (4.19)	71.3 (2.81)	65.9 (2.59)	58.2 (2.29)	31.7 (1.25)	1,309.8 (51.56)
Average precipitation days (≥ 0.1 mm)	9.6	10.1	12.6	11.2	12.7	12.0	11.3	9.5	8.0	8.8	9.3	7.5	122.6
Average snowy days	4.1	2.1	0.8	0	0	0	0	0	0	0	0.3	1.3	8.6
Average relative humidity (%)	76	76	75	74	74	78	76	77	77	77	77	74	76
Mean monthly sunshine hours	100.6	98.7	123.6	150.5	161.7	155.6	203.6	212.3	167.1	150.6	132.8	119.0	1,776.1
Percentage possible sunshine	31	31	33	39	38	37	48	52	46	43	42	38	40
Source: China Meteorological Administration

== Transport ==
Line 4 of Wuhan Metro is serving Caidian District.

== Infrastructure ==
Caidian District has been chosen by the Wuhan City authorities to construct a temporary 1000 bed hospital named Huoshenshan Hospital to cope with the Wuhan coronavirus in January 2020. Four state owned civil engineering firms are developing the site.

== Gallery ==
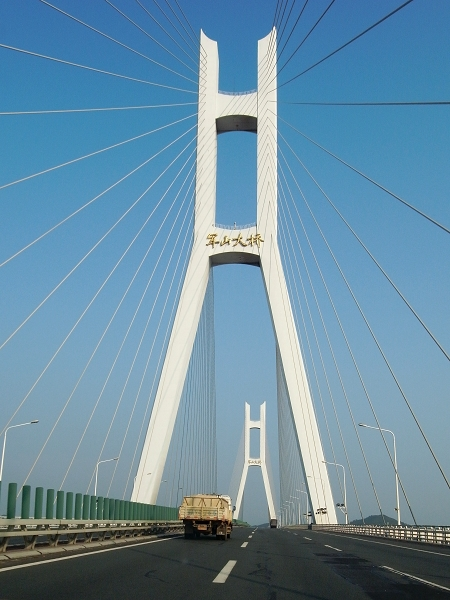
Junshan Yangtze Bridge Caidian District Principal Arch

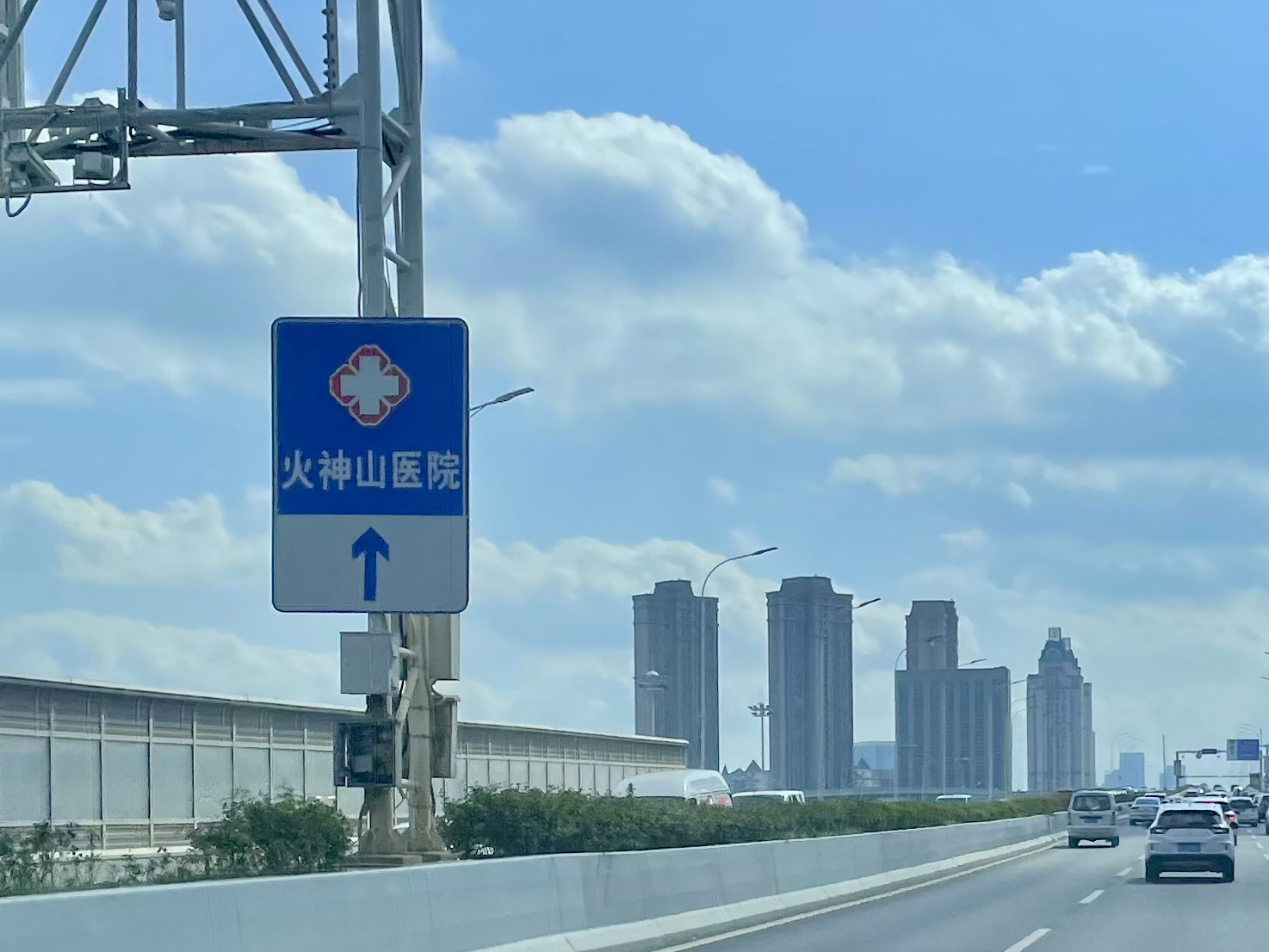
Road sign near the Huoshenshan Hospital

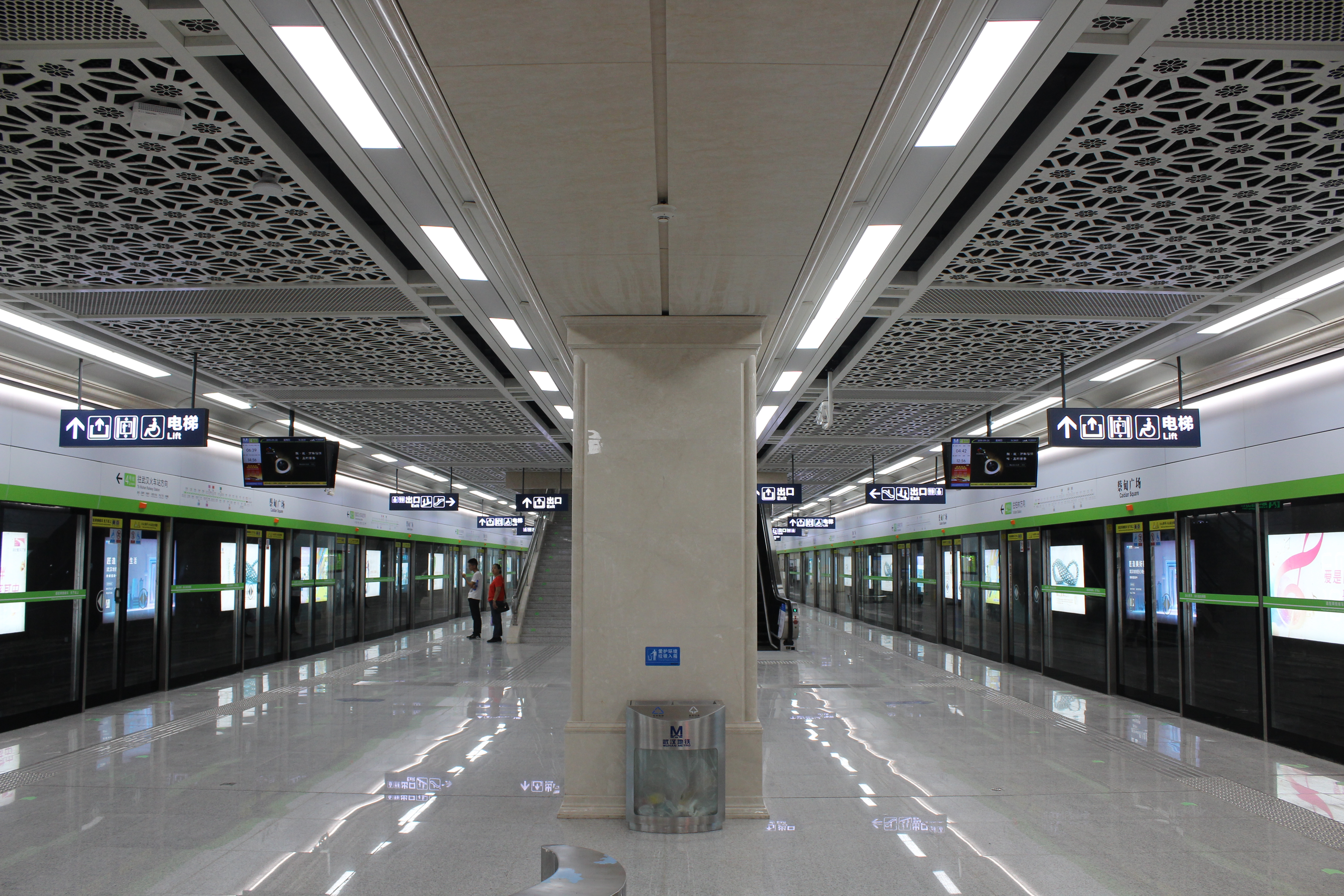
Caidian Square station, Line 4 of Wuhan Metro

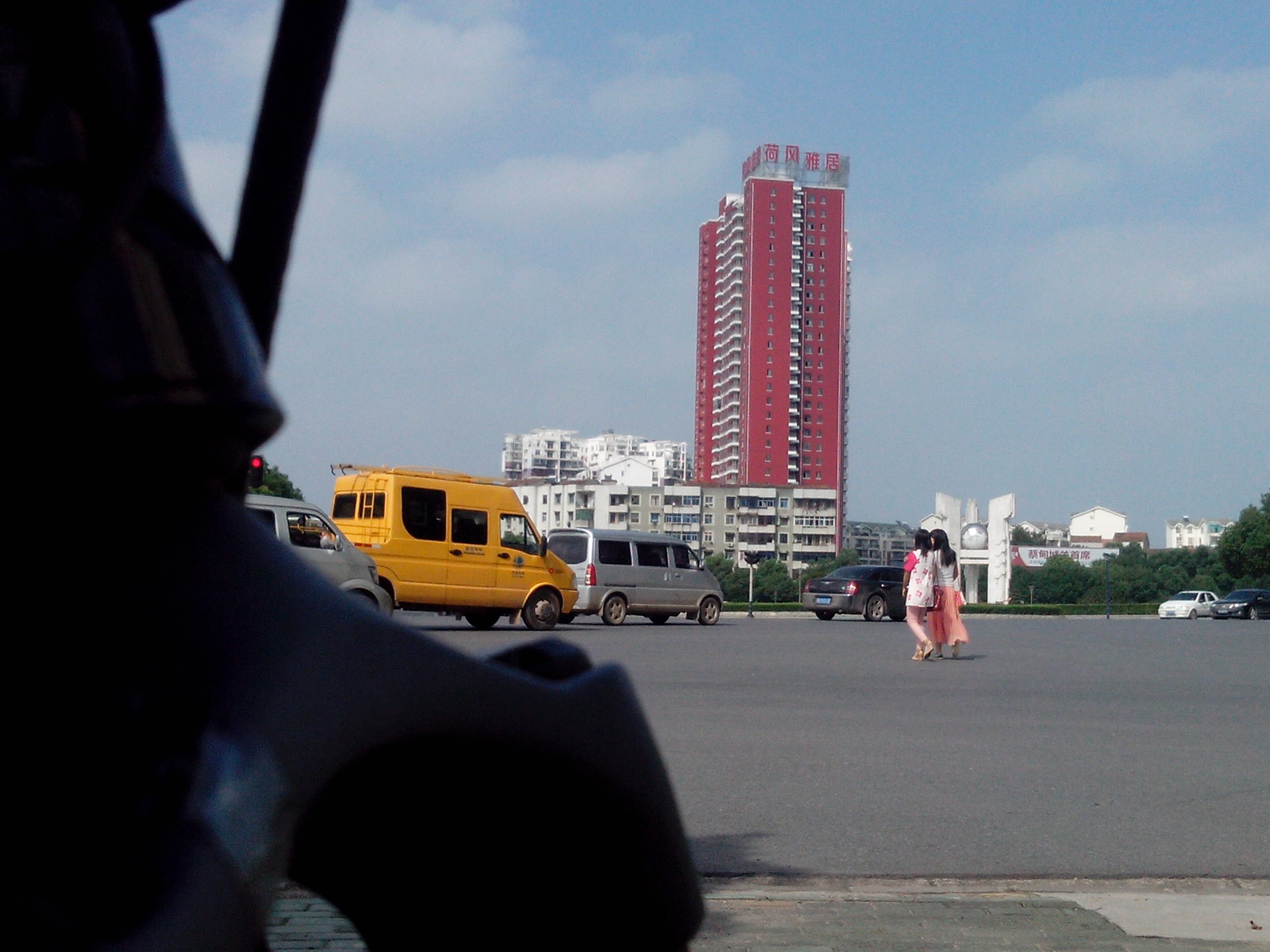
Caidian Square before reconstruction (before 2017)

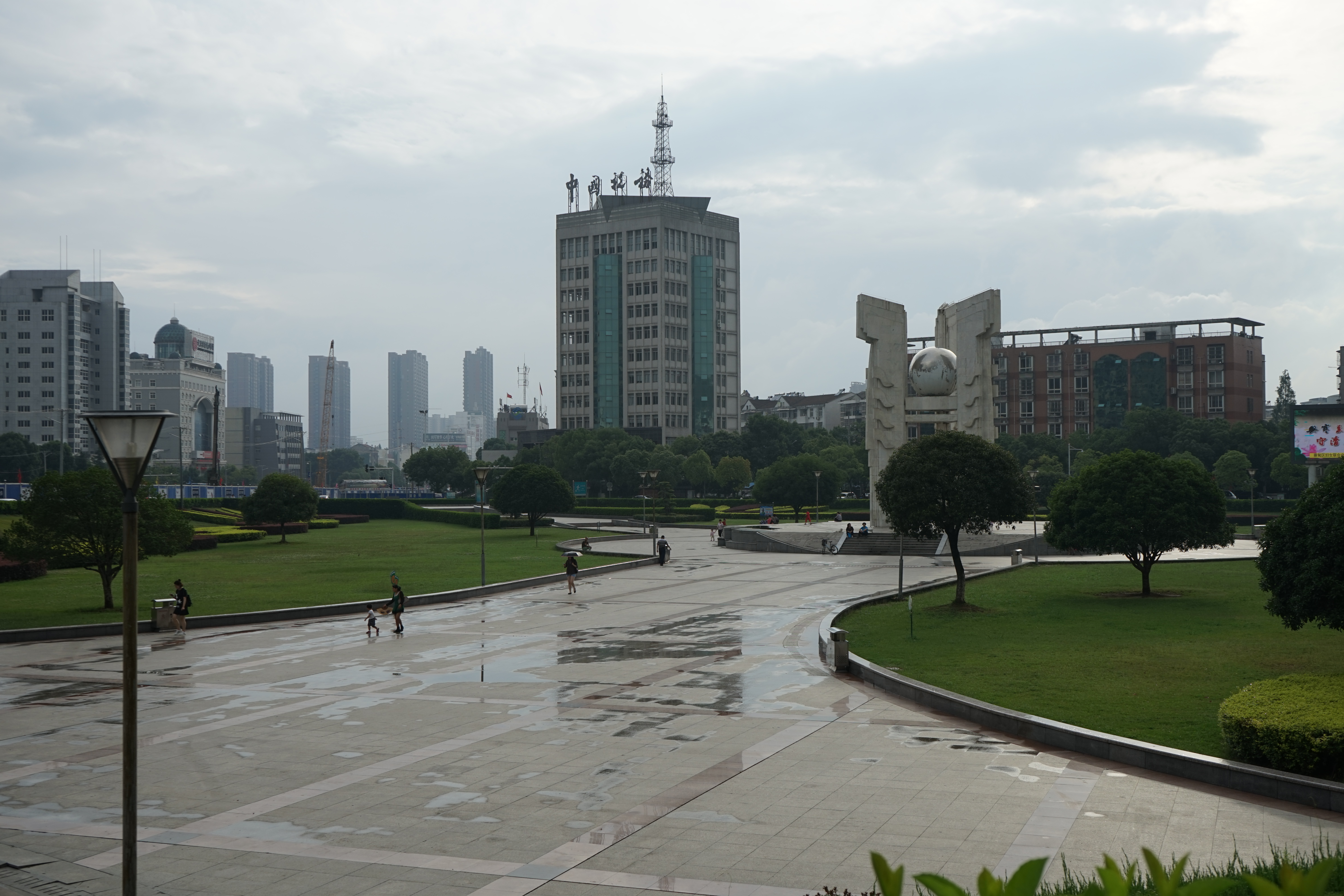
Caidian Square before reconstruction (before 2017)
