= Hongtu Boulevard station =

Wuhan Metro station

Hongtu Boulevard 宏图大道 metro
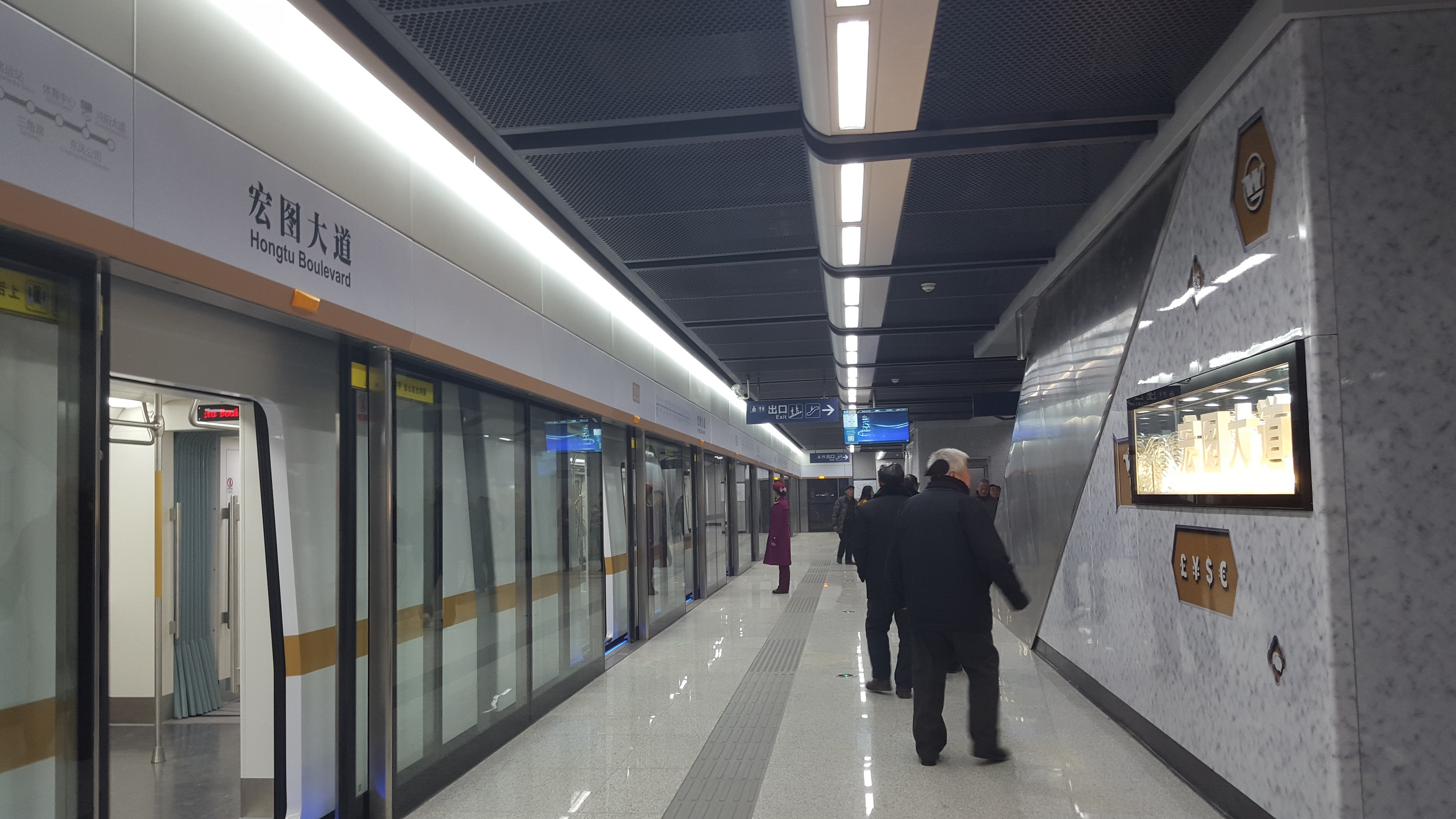

General information
- Location: Dongxihu District, Wuhan, Hubei; China
- Coordinates: 30.6697°N 114.2738°E
- Operated by: Wuhan Metro Co., Ltd
- Lines: Line 2; Line 3; Line 8
- Platforms: 6 (3 island platforms)

Construction
- Structure type: Underground

History
- Opened: December 28, 2015 (Line 3); December 28, 2016 (Line 2); December 26, 2018 (Line 8)

Services
| Preceding station | Wuhan Metro | Following station |
|---|---|---|
| Panlongcheng towards Tianhe International Airport | Line 2 | Changqingcheng towards Fozuling |
| Terminus | Line 3 | Citizens Home towards Zhuanyang Boulevard |
| Jintan Road Terminus | Line 8 | Tazihu towards Military Athletes' Village |
Route map
Location

Hongtu Boulevard Station (Chinese: 宏图大道站) is a station of Line 2, Line 3 and Line 8 of Wuhan Metro and is also the northern terminus of Line 3. It entered revenue service on December 28, 2015. It is located in Dongxihu District. This station is the cross-platform interchange station of Line 2 and 3, with additional transfer to Line 8 platform below.

== Station layout ==
| G | Entrances and Exits | Exits A-H, J-L |
| B1 | Councourse | Faregates, Station Agent |
| B2 | Northbound | ← Line 2 towards Tianhe International Airport (Panlongcheng) |
| B2 | Island platform, doors will open on the left/right |
| B2 | Northbound | ← Line 3 termination platform |
| B2 | Southbound | Line 3 towards Zhuanyang Boulevard (Citizens Home) → |
| B2 | Island platform, doors will open on the left/right |
| B2 | Southbound | Line 2 towards Fozuling (Changqingcheng) → |
| B3 | Northbound | ← Line 8 towards Jintan Road (Terminus) |
| B3 | Island platform, doors will open on the left |
| B3 | Southbound | Line 8 towards Military Athletes' Village (Tazihu) → |
