= Zhuanyang Boulevard station =

Metro station in Wuhan, China

Zhuanyang Boulevard 沌阳大道 metro
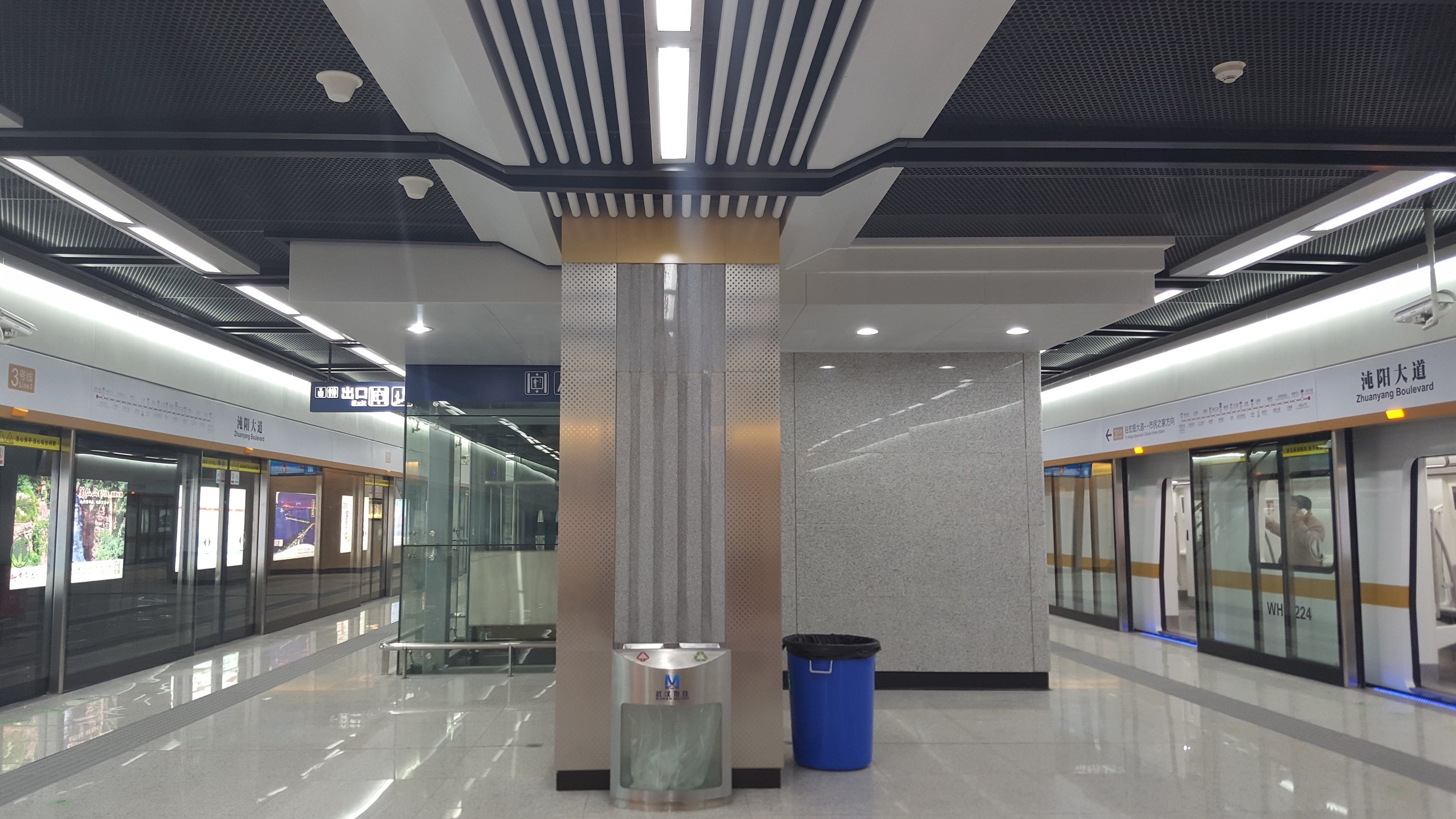

General information
- Location: Hannan District, Wuhan, Hubei; China
- Coordinates: 30.492241°N 114.15207°E
- Operated by: Wuhan Metro Co., Ltd
- Line: Line 3
- Platforms: 2 (1 island platform)

Construction
- Structure type: Underground

History
- Opened: December 28, 2015 (Line 3)

Services
Preceding station	Wuhan Metro	Following station
Dongfeng Motor Corporation towards Hongtu Boulevard	Line 3	Terminus
Location

Zhuanyang Boulevard Station (Chinese: 沌阳大道站) is a southern terminus of Line 3 of Wuhan Metro. It entered revenue service on December 28, 2015. It is located in Hannan District (or Wuhan Economic-Technological Zone, WEDZ).

== Station layout ==
G	Entrances and Exits	Exits A-D
B1	Concourse	Faregates, Station Agent
B2	Northbound	← Line 3 towards Hongtu Boulevard (Dongfeng Motor Corporation)
B2	Island platform, doors will open on the left
B2	Southbound	Line 3 termination platform →
