= Renhe Road station =

Chinese railway station

Renhe Road 仁和路
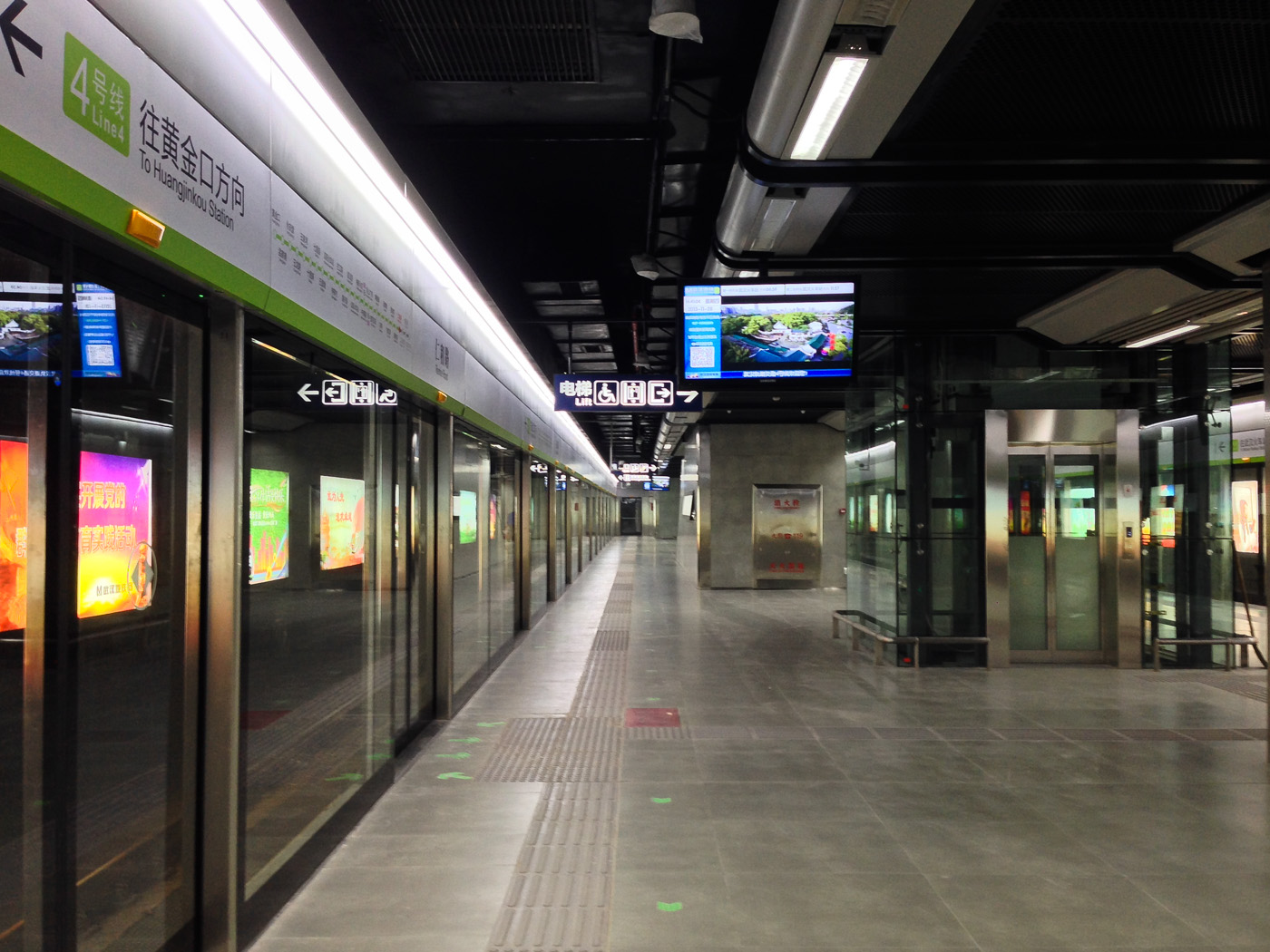

General information
- Location: Hongshan District, Wuhan, Hubei; China
- Coordinates: 30.6074°N 114.3835°E
- Operated by: Wuhan Metro Co., Ltd
- Line: Line 4
- Platforms: 2 (1 island platform)

Construction
- Structure type: Underground

History
- Opened: December 28, 2013 (Line 4)

Services
Preceding station	Wuhan Metro	Following station
Yuanlin Road towards Bailin	Line 4	Gongye 4th Road towards Wuhan Railway Station
Location

Renhe Road Station (Chinese: 仁和路站) is a station of Line 4 of Wuhan Metro. It entered revenue service on December 28, 2013. It is located in Hongshan District.

== Station layout ==
G	Entrances and Exits	Exits A-D
B1	Concourse	Faregates, Station Agent
B2	Westbound	← Line 4 towards Bailin (Yuanlin Road)
B2	Island platform, doors will open on the left
B2	Eastbound	Line 4 towards Wuhan Railway Station (Gongye 4th Road) →

== Gallery ==
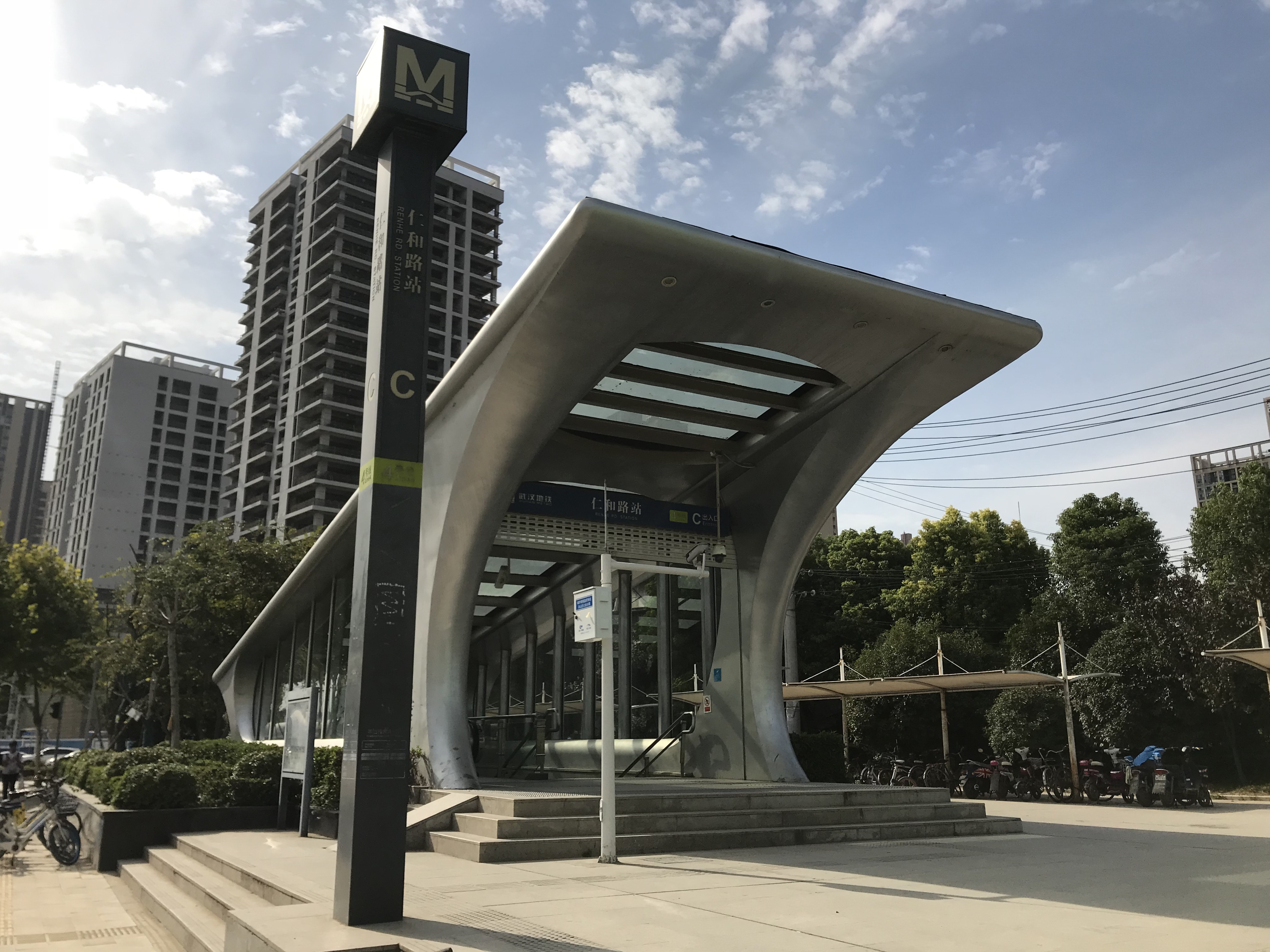
Entrance C

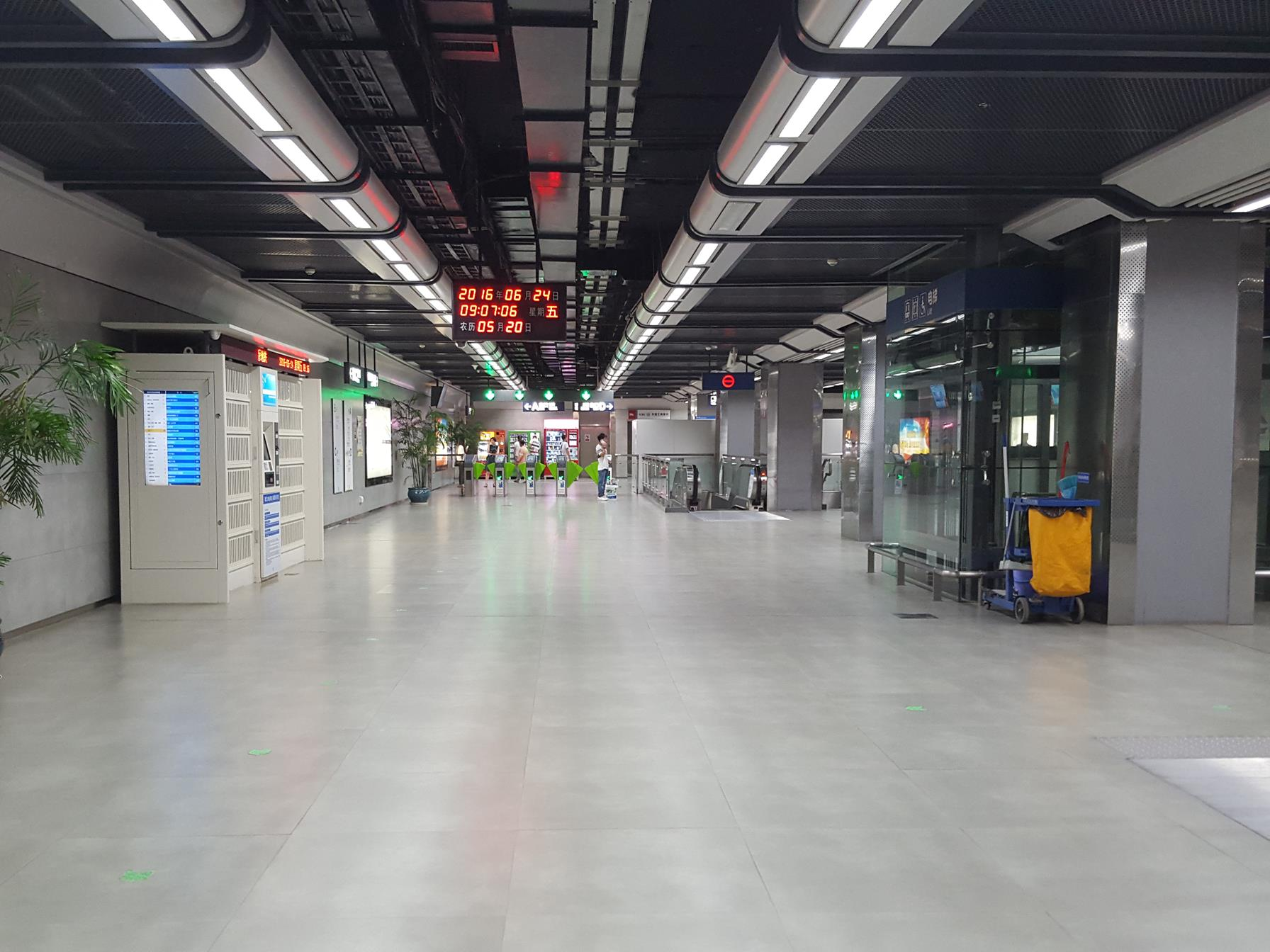
Concourse

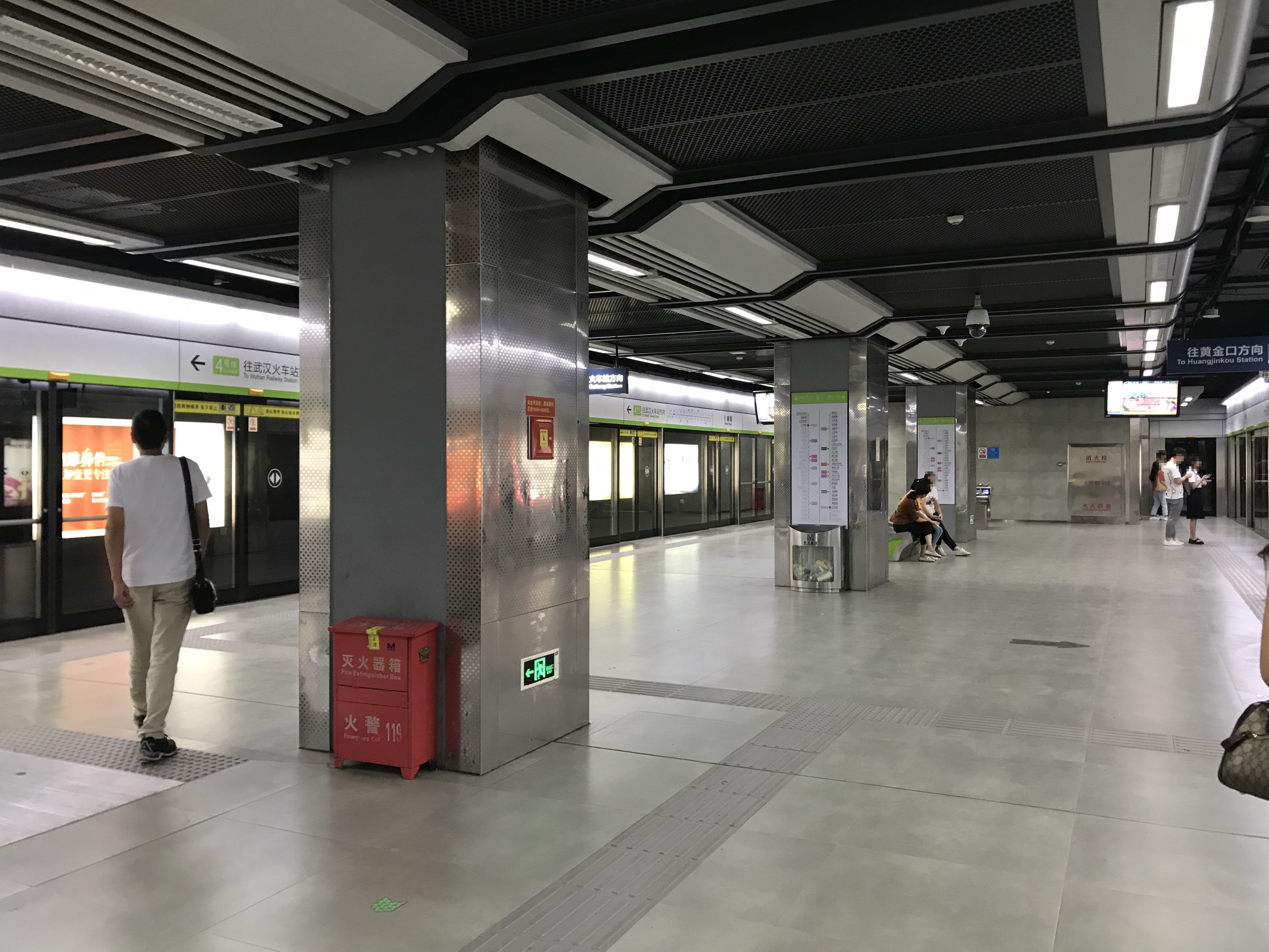
Platform
