= Wuhan =

Capital of Hubei, China

Wuhan 武汉市
- Prefecture-level and sub-provincial city
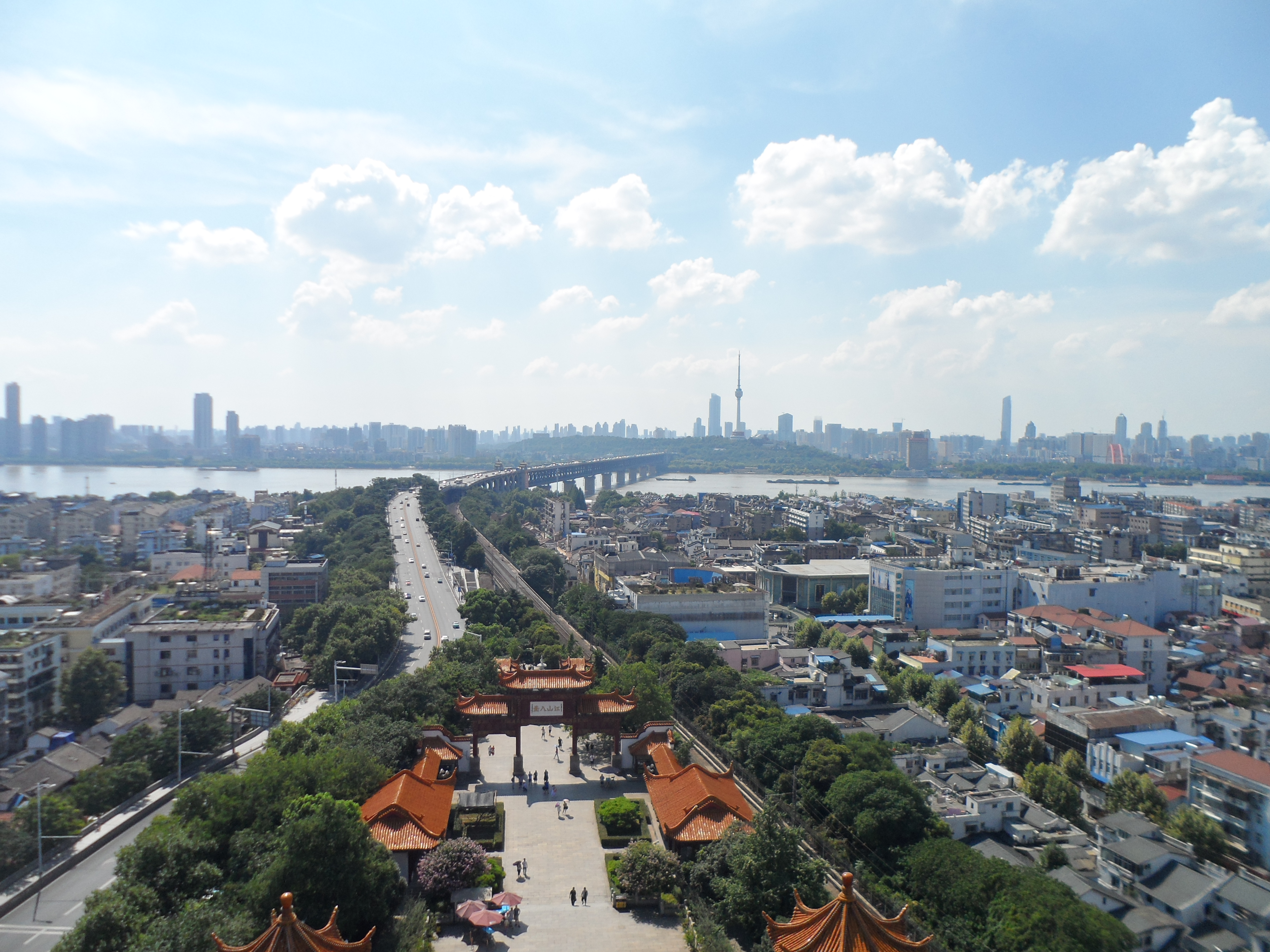
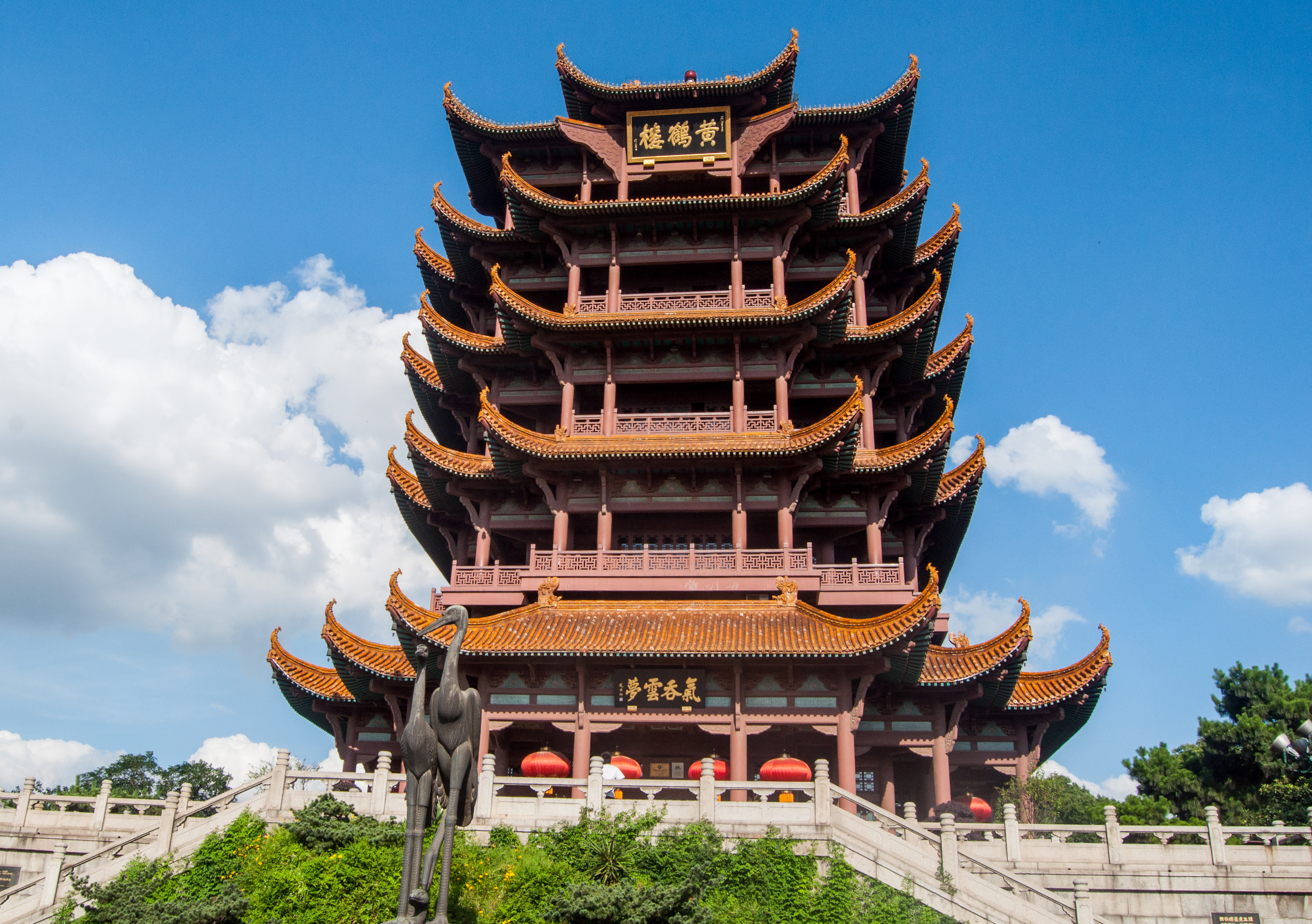
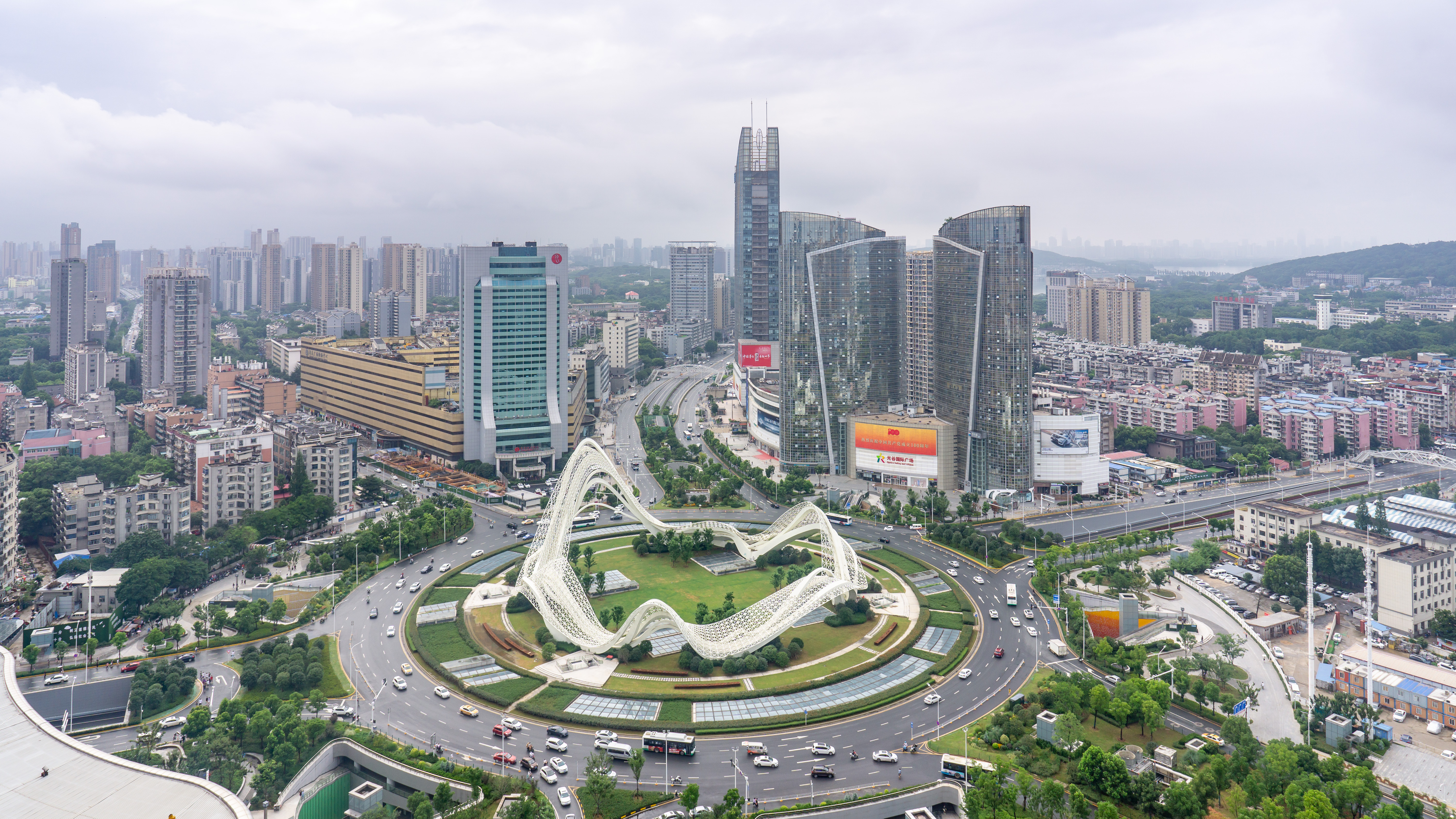
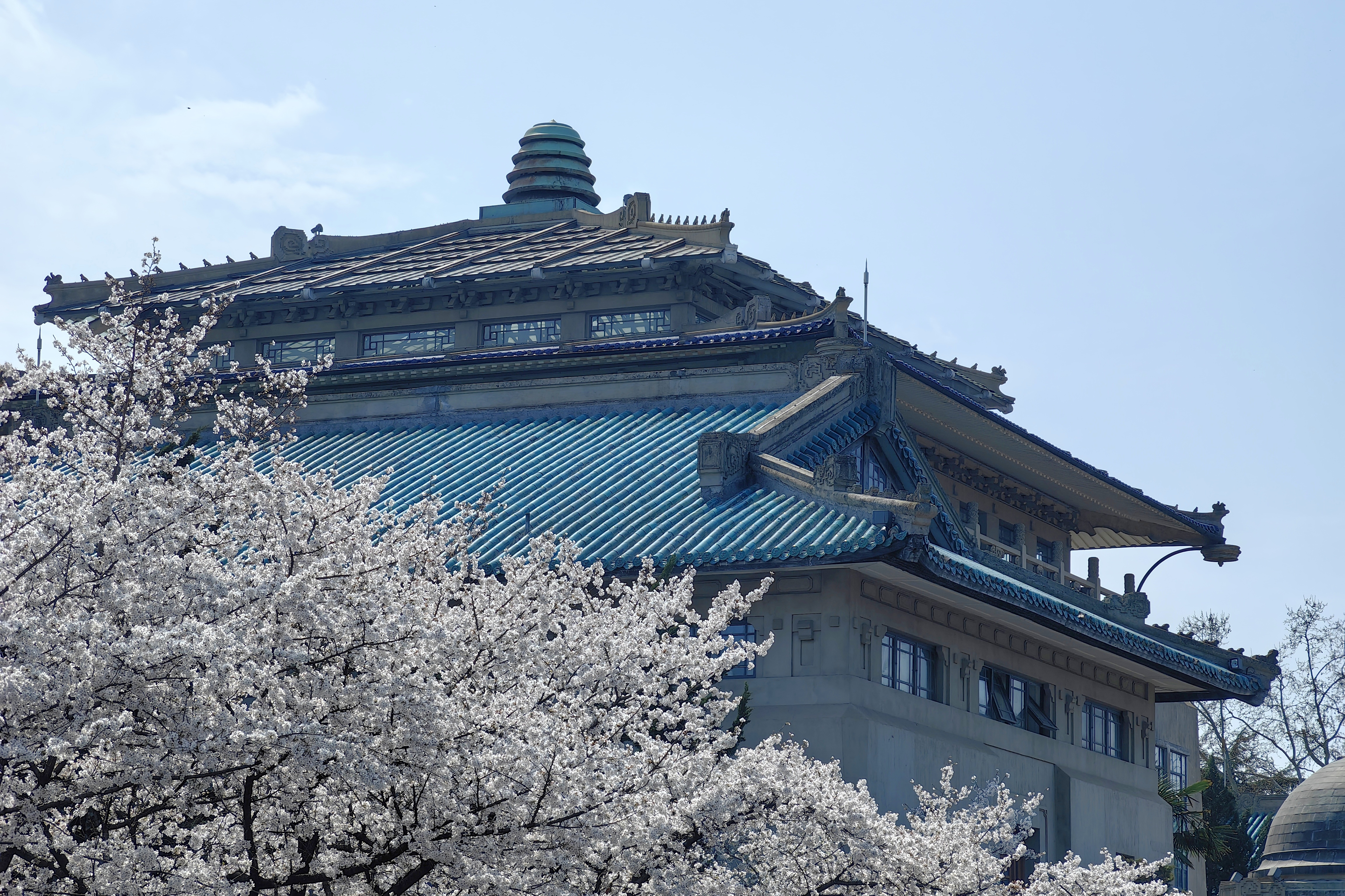
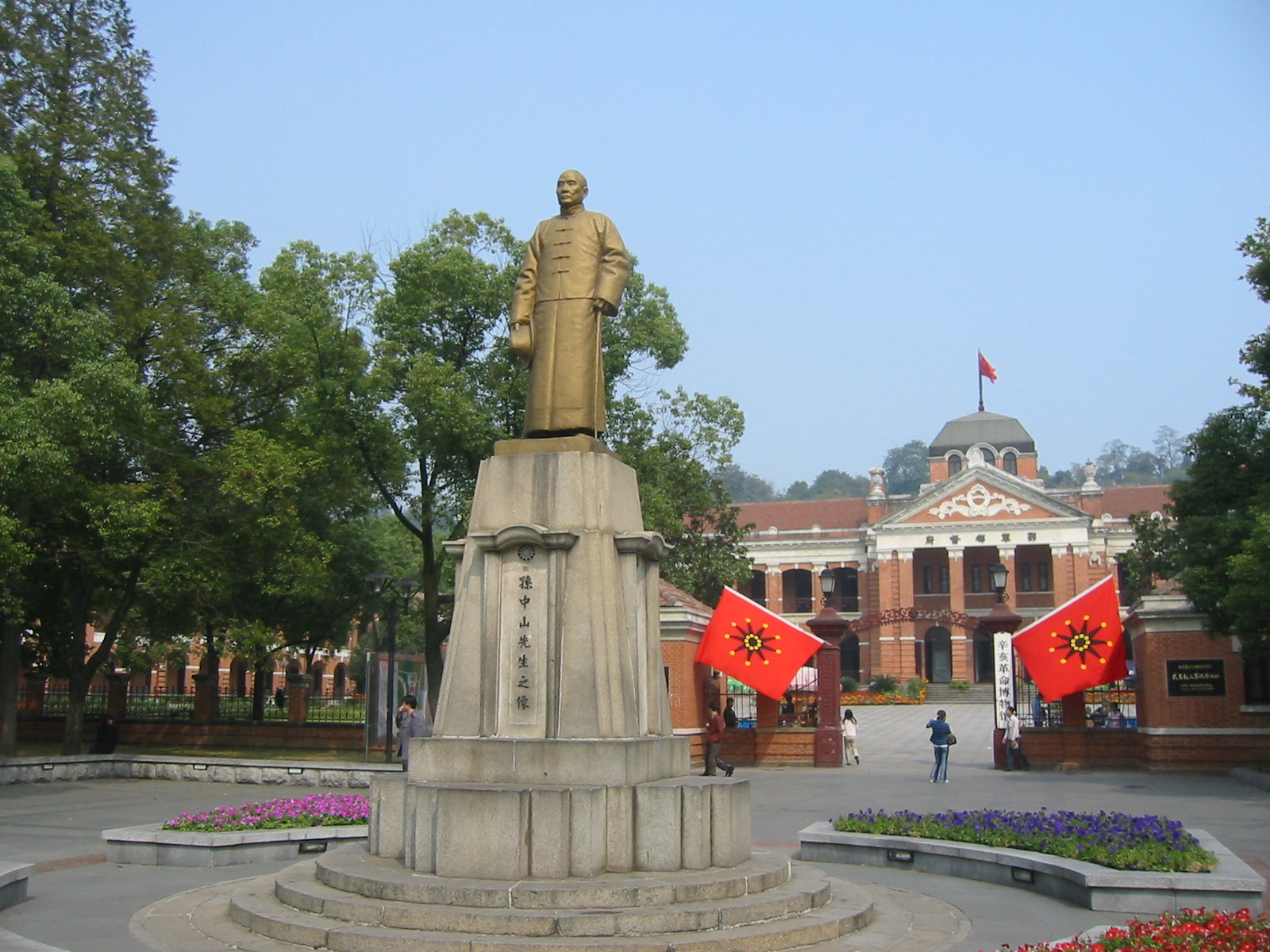
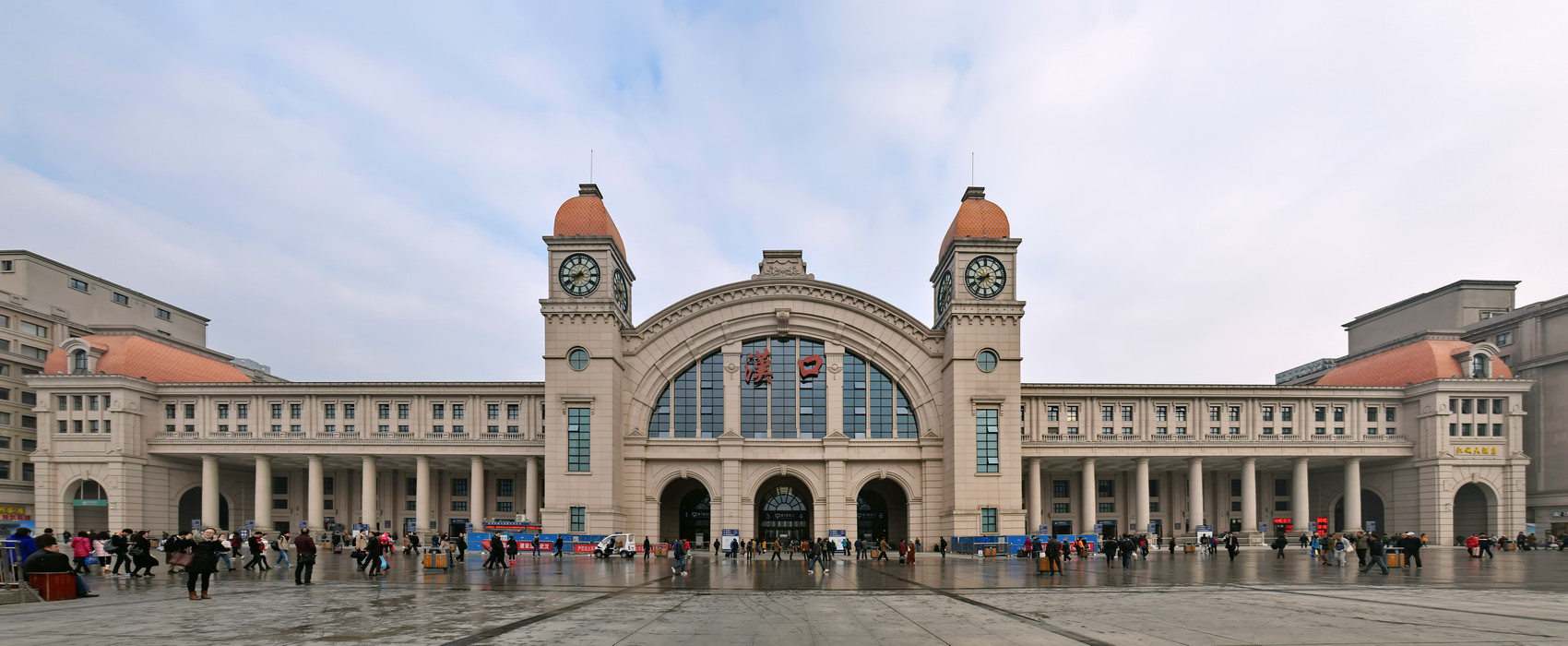
- View of the Yangtze River from Snake Hill Yellow Crane Tower Optics Valley Wuhan University Wuchang Uprising Government Site Hankou railway station
- Nicknames: 九省通衢 "China's Thoroughfare"; The Chicago of China; 江城 ("River City")
- Motto: 武汉，每天不一样！ ("Wuhan, Different Every Day!")
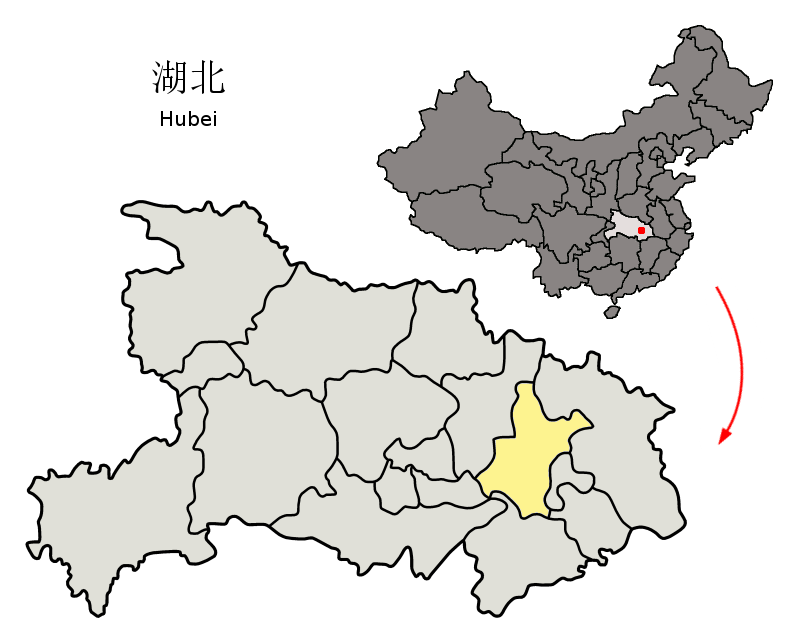
- Location of Wuhan City jurisdiction in Hubei

- Location of the city center in Hubei Wuhan (Eastern China) Wuhan (China)
- Coordinates (Wuhan municipal government): 30°35′42″N 114°17′51″E
- Country: China
- Province: Hubei
- Settled: 1500 BC
- First unified: January 1, 1927
- Hancheng walls built: 223 BC
- Municipal seat: Jiang'an District
- Divisions; County-level; Township-level: 13 districts; 156 subdistricts, 1 towns, 3 townships

Government
  - Type: Prefecture-level and sub-provincial city
  - Body: Wuhan Municipal People's Congress
  - Party Secretary: Guo Yuanqiang
  - Congress Chairman: Hu Lishan
  - Mayor: Cheng Yongwen
  - CPPCC Chairman: Yang Zhi

Area
  - Prefecture-level and sub-provincial city: 8,494.41 km^{2} (3,279.71 sq mi)
  - Urban (2018): 1,528 km^{2} (590 sq mi)

Population (2022)
  - Prefecture-level and sub-provincial city: 13,739,000
  - Rank: 7th in China
  - Density: 1,617.4/km^{2} (4,189.1/sq mi)
  - Urban density: 5,686/km^{2} (14,727/sq mi)
- Demonym: Wuhanese

GDP(2023)
  - Prefecture-level and sub-provincial city: CN¥ 2.215 trillion US$ 317.93 billion
  - Per capita: CN¥ 161,198; US$ 23,141
- Time zone: UTC+08:00 (China Standard)
- Postal code: 430000–430400
- Area code: 0027
- ISO 3166 code: CN-HB-01
- License plate prefixes: 鄂A; 鄂W; 鄂O (police and authorities)
- HDI (2015): 0.839 (9th) – very high
- City tree: Metasequoia
- City flower: Plum blossom
- Website: 武汉政府门户网站 (Wuhan Government Web Portal) (in Chinese); English Wuhan (in English)

Wuhan
- "Wuhan" in Simplified (top) and Traditional (bottom) Chinese characters
- Simplified Chinese: 武汉
- Traditional Chinese: 武漢
- Literal meaning: "[The combined names of] Wu[chang], Han[kou], Han[yang]"
Transcriptions
Standard Mandarin
- Hanyu Pinyin: Wǔhàn
- Bopomofo: ㄨˇ ㄏㄢˋ
- Gwoyeu Romatzyh: Wuuhann
- Wade–Giles: Wu^{3}-han^{4}
- Tongyong Pinyin: Wǔhàn
- IPA: [ù.xân]
Wu
- Suzhounese: Vu^{6}-hoe^{3}
Yue: Cantonese
- Yale Romanization: Móuh-hon
- Jyutping: mou5 hon3
- IPA: [mɔw˩˧ hɔn˧]
Southern Min
- Hokkien POJ: Bú-hàn

Wuhan (Note: /wuːˈhæn/, US also /wuːˈhɑːn, ˈwuː-/; simplified Chinese: 武汉; traditional Chinese: 武漢; pinyin: Wǔhàn; [ù.xân]) is the capital of Hubei, China. With a population of 13,861,900, it is the most populous city in Hubei and the seventh-most-populous city in China. It is also one of China's nine national central cities.

Wuhan historically served as a busy city port for commerce and trading with some crucial influences on Chinese history. The name "Wuhan" came from the city's historical origin from the conglomeration of Wuchang, Hankou, and Hanyang, which are collectively known as the "Three Towns of Wuhan" (武汉三镇). Wuhan lies in the eastern Jianghan Plain, at the confluence of the Yangtze river and its largest tributary, the Han River, and is known as "Nine Provinces' Thoroughfare" (九省通衢). Wuhan was the site of the 1911 Wuchang Uprising against the Qing dynasty which ended 2,000 years of dynastic rule. Wuhan was briefly a capital of China twice, in 1927 under a left wing Kuomintang (KMT) government, and in 1937 as a provisional wartime capital during World War II. In 1938, during the Second Sino-Japanese War, the city was the site of the Battle of Wuhan. On December 31, 2019, SARS-CoV-2, a novel coronavirus that later caused the COVID-19 pandemic, was first discovered in Wuhan and the city was the location of the first lockdown of the pandemic in January 2020.

Wuhan is considered the political, economic, financial, commercial, cultural, and educational center of Central China. It is a major transportation hub, with dozens of railways, roads, and expressways passing through the city and connecting to other major cities. Because of its key role in domestic transportation, Wuhan is sometimes referred to as "the Chicago of China" by foreign sources. The "Golden Waterway" of the Yangtze River and the Han River traverse the urban area and divide Wuhan into the three districts of Wuchang, Hankou, and Hanyang. The Wuhan Yangtze River Bridge crosses the Yangtze in the city. The Three Gorges Dam, the world's largest power station in terms of installed capacity, is located nearby. Historically, Wuhan has suffered risks of flooding, prompting the government to alleviate the situation by introducing ecologically friendly absorption mechanisms.

While Wuhan has been a traditional manufacturing hub for decades, it is also one of the areas promoting modern industrial changes in China. Wuhan has three national development zones, four scientific and technological development parks, over 350 research institutes, 1,656 high tech enterprises, numerous enterprise incubators and investments from 230 Fortune Global 500 firms. It produced GDP (nominal) of US$318 billion in 2025. The Dongfeng Motor Corporation, an automobile manufacturer, is headquartered in Wuhan. The city is home to multiple notable institutes of higher education, including Wuhan University and the Huazhong University of Science and Technology. Wuhan is a major city by scientific research outputs, ranking 8th globally and 5th in the Asia-Pacific (after Beijing, Shanghai, Nanjing and Guangzhou). In 2017, Wuhan was designated as a Creative City by UNESCO, in the field of design. Wuhan is classified as a Beta- (global second tier) city together with seven other cities in China, including Changsha, Dalian, Jinan, Shenyang, Xiamen, Xi'an and Zhengzhou by the Globalization and World Cities Research Network. Wuhan is also one of the world's top 100 financial centers, according to the Global Financial Centres Index.

== Etymology ==
The name "Wuhan" comes from the two major cities on the banks of the Yangtze River that make up the Wuhan metropolis: "Wu" refers to the city of Wuchang (Chinese: 武昌), which lies on the southern bank of the Yangtze, while "Han" refers to the city of Hankou (Chinese: 汉口), which lies on the northern bank of the Yangtze. "Hankou" means "Mouth of the Han", from its position at the confluence of the Han with the Yangtze River.

In 1926, the Northern Expedition reached the Wuhan area and it was decided to merge Hankou, Wuchang and Hanyang into one city in order to make a new capital for Nationalist China. On January 1, 1927, the resulting city was proclaimed as '武漢' (the traditional Chinese characters for 'Wuhan'), which was later simplified as '武汉' (also 'Wuhan').

== History ==
=== Antiquity ===
Panlongcheng, located in the southernmost area of the Erligang culture

The Wuhan area has been settled for 3,500 years. Panlongcheng, an archaeological site primarily associated with the Erligang culture (c. 1510 – c. 1460 BC) (being sparsely populated during the earlier Erlitou period), is located in modern-day Huangpi District of Wuhan.

During the Western Zhou the State of E, which gives its name to the single character abbreviation for Hubei province, controlled the present-day Wuchang area south of the Yangtze River. After the conquest of the E state in 863 BC, the present-day Wuhan area was controlled by the State of Chu for the rest of the Western Zhou and Eastern Zhou periods. After the State of Huang was conquered by State of Chu in the summer of 648 BC, the people of Huang were moved into the area in and around present-day Wuhan. Local geographical terms including the name of Wuhan's Huangpi District were named after the State of Huang. Chu was in turn conquered by Qin in 223 BC.

=== Imperial China ===
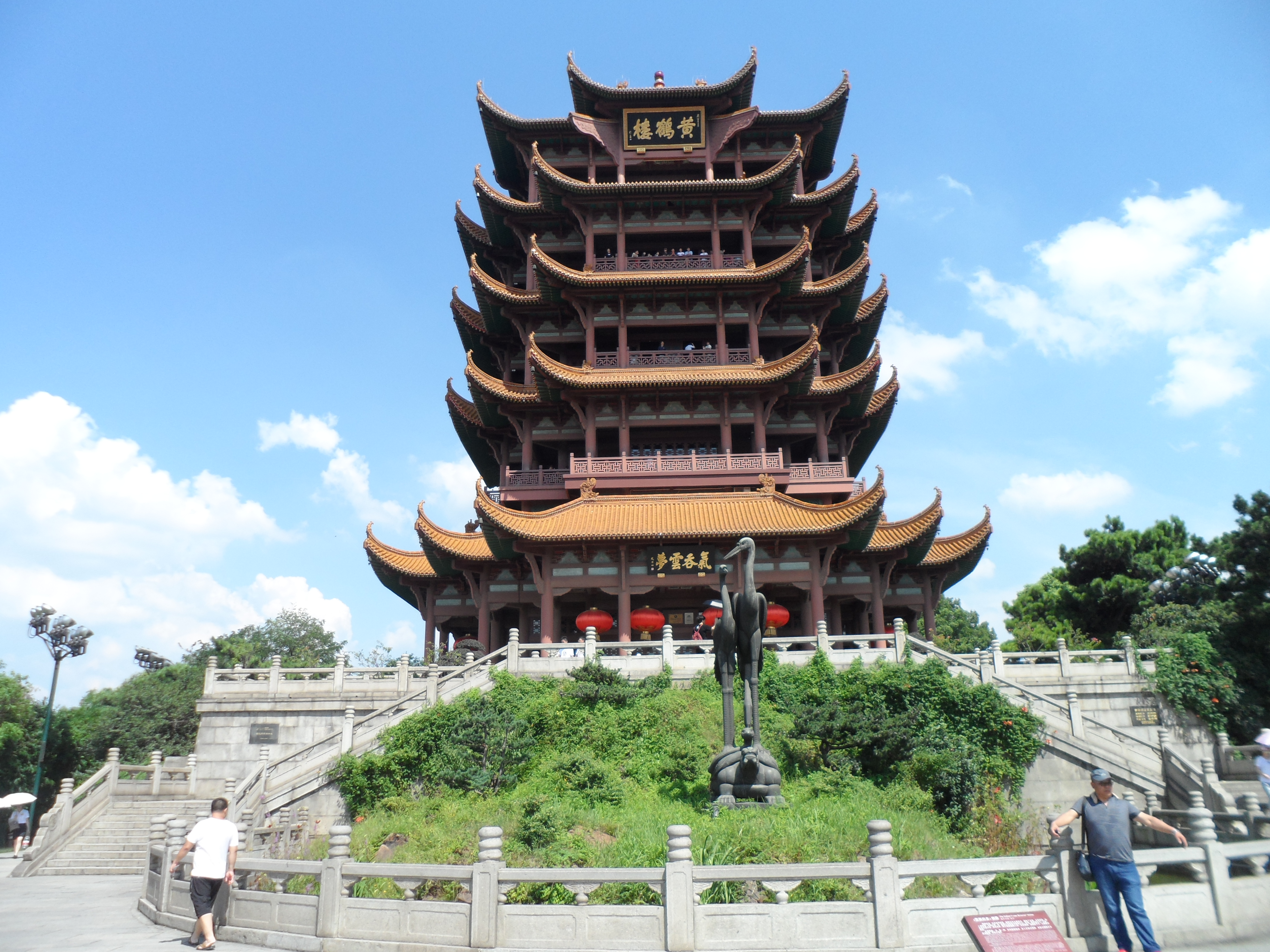
Yellow Crane Tower

During the time of the Han dynasty, Hanyang became a fairly busy port. The Battle of Xiakou in AD 203 and Battle of Jiangxia five years later were fought in the region over control of Jiangxia Commandery, territories of which included much of present-day eastern Hubei. In the winter of 208/9, one of the most famous battles in Chinese history and a central event in the Romance of the Three Kingdoms—the Battle of Red Cliffs—took place near the Yangtze River, with the cliffs near Wuhan identified as one of the potential locations. Around that time, walls were built to protect Hanyang (AD 206) and Wuchang (AD 223). The latter event marks the foundation of Wuhan. In AD 223, the Yellow Crane Tower, one of the Four Great Towers of China, was constructed on the Wuchang side of the Yangtze River by order of Sun Quan, leader of the Eastern Wu. The tower became a sacred site of Taoism.

Due to tensions between the Eastern Wu and Cao Wei kingdoms, in the autumn of 228, (Note: Man Chong's biography in the Sanguozhi mentioned that these events took place in the 3rd year of the Taihe era (227–233) of Cao Rui's reign, i.e., the year 229. This is a mistake. It was actually in the 2nd year of the Taihe era, i.e., the year 228, according to the Zizhi Tongjian.) Cao Rui, grandson of Cao Cao and the second emperor of the state of Cao Wei, ordered the general Man Chong to lead troops to Xiakou (夏口; in present-day Wuhan). In 279, Wang Jun and his army conquered strategic locations in Wu territory such as Xiling (in present-day Yichang, Hubei), Xiakou (夏口; present-day Hankou) and Wuchang (武昌; present-day Ezhou, Hubei).

During the Northern and Southern dynasties period, the Wuhan area was part of the successive Southern dynasty states Liu Song (420–479), Southern Qi (479–502), Liang, and Western Liang.

In fall 550, Hou Jing sent Ren Yue to attack both Xiao Daxin and Xiao Fan's son Xiao Si (蕭嗣). Ren killed Xiao Si in battle, and Xiao Daxin, unable to resist, surrendered, allowing Hou to take his domain under control. Meanwhile, Xiao Guan, who had by now settled at Jiangxia (江夏, in modern Wuhan), was planning to attack Hou, but this drew Xiao Yi's ire—believing that Xiao Guan was intending to contend for the throne—and he sent Wang to attack Xiao Guan. In summer 567, Chen Xu commissioned Wu Mingche as the governor of Xiang Province and had him command a major part of the troops against Hua, along with Chunyu Liang (淳于量). The opposing sides met at Zhuankou (沌口, in modern Wuhan).

The city has long been renowned as a center for the arts (especially poetry) and for intellectual studies. Cui Hao, a celebrated poet of the Tang dynasty, visited the Yellow Crane Tower in the early 8th century; his poem made it the most celebrated building in southern China.

In spring 877, Wang Xianzhi captured E Prefecture (鄂州, in modern Wuhan). He then returned north, joining forces with Huang again, and they surrounded Song Wei at Song Prefecture (宋州, in modern Shangqiu, Henan). In winter 877, Huang Chao pillaged Qi and Huang (黃州, in modern Wuhan) Prefectures.

Before Kublai Khan arrived in 1259, word reached him that Möngke had died. Kublai decided to keep the death of his brother secret and continued the attack on the Wuhan area, near the Yangtze. The present-day Wuying Pagoda was constructed at the end of the Song dynasty between attacks by the Mongolian forces. Under the Mongol rulers (Yuan dynasty) (after 1301), the Wuchang prefecture, headquartered in the town, became the capital of Hubei province. Hankou, from the Ming to late Qing, was under the administration of the local government in Hanyang, although it was already one of the four major national markets (四大名镇) of the Ming dynasty.

Hanyang's Guiyuan Temple was completed in the 15th year of Shunzhi (1658).

By the dawn of the 18th century, Hankou had become one of China's top four trading centers. In the late 19th century, railroads were extended on a north–south axis through the city, making Wuhan an important transshipment point between rail and river traffic. Also during this period foreign powers extracted mercantile concessions, with the riverfront of Hankou being divided up into foreign-controlled merchant districts. These districts contained trading firm offices, warehouses, and docking facilities. The French had a concession in Hankou. During the Taiping Heavenly Kingdom, the Wuhan area was controlled for many years by rebel forces and the Yellow Crane Tower, Xingfu Temple, Zhuodaoquan Temple and other buildings were repurposed or damaged. During the Second Opium War (known in the West as the Arrow War, 1856–1860), the government of the Qing dynasty was defeated by the western powers and signed the Treaties of Tianjin and the Convention of Peking, which stipulated eleven cities or regions (including Hankou) as trading ports. In December 1858, James Bruce, 8th Earl of Elgin, High Commissioner to China, led four warships up the Yangtze River in Wuhan to collect the information needed for opening the trading port in Wuhan.

In the spring of 1861, Counselor Harry Smith Parkes and Admiral Herbert were sent to Wuhan to open a trading port. On the basis of the Convention of Peking, Parkes concluded the Hankou Lend-Lease Treaty with Guan Wen, the governor-general of Hunan and Hubei. It brought an area of 30.53 square kilometers (11.79 sq mi) along the Yangtze River (from latter-day Jianghan Road to Hezuo Road) to become a British Concession and permitted Britain to set up its consulate in the concession.

In 1862, Russian tea merchants arrived in the treaty port of Hankou. Russians in Hankou established four factories using assembly lines and machinery to produce brick tea, and became the city's richest industrialists in what would become the Russian concession. Japanese immigrants, mainly traders, also started arriving in 1874.

Wuhan in 1864

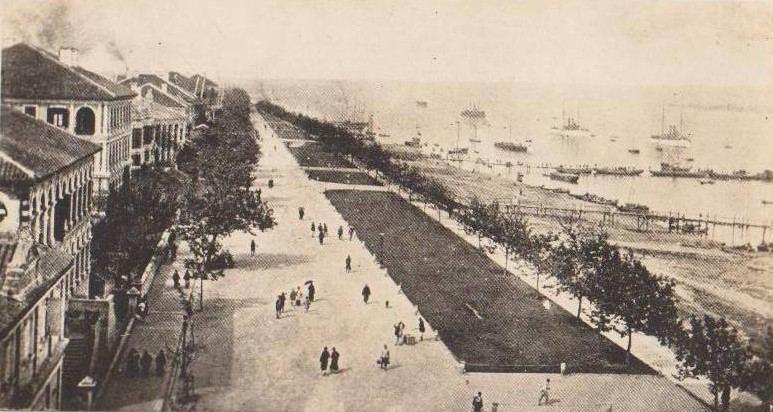
Foreign concessions along the Hankou Bund c. 1900.

In 1889, Zhang Zhidong was transferred from Viceroy of Liangguang (Guangdong and Guangxi provinces) to Viceroy of Huguang (Hunan and Hubei provinces). He governed the province for 18 years, until 1907. During this period, he elucidated the theory of "Chinese learning as the basis, Western learning for application," known as the ti-yong ideal. He set up many heavy industries, founded Hanyang Steel Plant, Daye Iron Mine, Pingxiang Coal Mine and Hubei Arsenal and set up local textile industries, boosting the flourishing modern industry in Wuhan. Meanwhile, he initiated education reform, opened dozens of modern educational organizations successively, such as Lianghu (Hunan and Hubei) Academy of Classical Learning, Civil General Institute, Military General Institute, Foreign Languages Institute and Lianghu (Hunan and Hubei) General Normal School, and selected a great many students for study overseas, which well promoted the development of China's modern education. Furthermore, he trained a modern military and organized a modern army including a zhen and a xie (both zhen and xie are military units in the Qing dynasty) in Hubei.

Originally known as the Hubei Arsenal, the Hanyang Arsenal was founded in 1891, with funds diverted from the Nanyang Fleet in Guangdong to build the arsenal. It cost about 250,000 pounds sterling and was built in 4 years. On April 23, 1894, construction was completed and the arsenal, occupying some 40 acres (160,000 m^{2}), could start production of small-caliber cannons. It built magazine-fed rifles, Gruson quick fire guns, and cartridges.

In 1896, the Russian Empire also acquired a concession in Hankou.

=== Wuchang Uprising ===
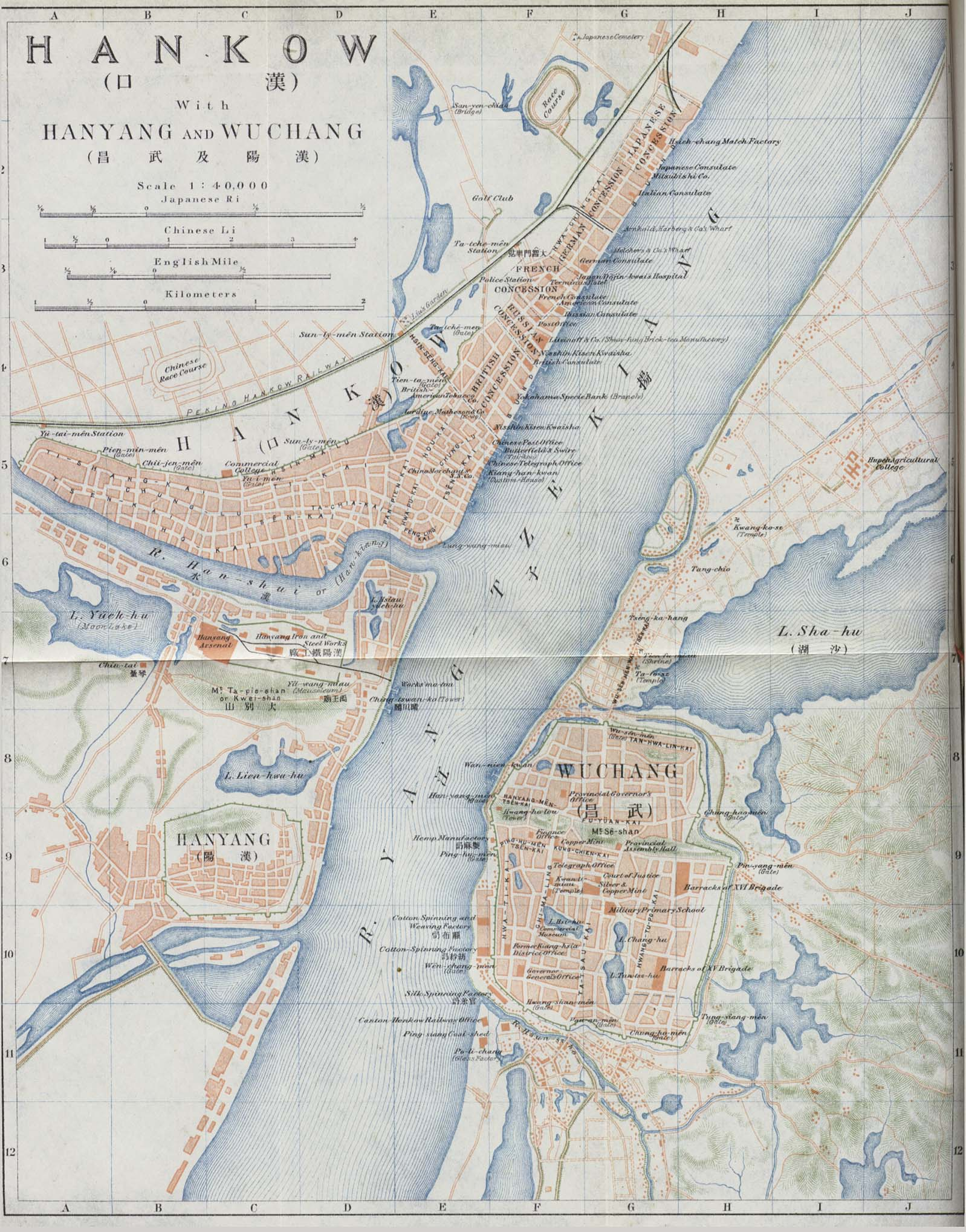
Map from 1915 showing the location of the three cities (Wuchang, Hanyang and Hankou) separated by the Yangtze River and the Han River. The three cities merged in 1927 to form Wuhan.

By 1900, according to Collier's magazine, Hankou, the Yangtze River boom town, was "the St. Louis and Chicago of China." On October 10, 1911, Sun Yat-sen's followers launched the Wuchang Uprising, which led to the collapse of the Qing state and 2,000 years of dynastic rule, as well as the establishment of the Republic of China.

The Wuchang Uprising of October 1911, which overthrew the Qing dynasty, originated in Wuhan. Before the uprising, anti-Qing secret societies were active in Wuhan. In September 1911, the outbreak of the protests in Sichuan forced the Qing authorities to send part of the New Army garrisoned in Wuhan to suppress the rebellion. On September 14 the Literary Society (文學社) and the Progressive Association (共進會), two local revolutionary organizations in Hubei, set up joint headquarters in Wuchang and planned for an uprising. On the morning of October 9, a bomb at the office of the political arrangement exploded prematurely and alerted local authorities. The proclamation for the uprising, beadroll and the revolutionaries' official seal fell into the hands of Rui Cheng, the governor-general of Hunan and Hubei, who demolished the uprising headquarters the same day and set out to arrest the revolutionaries listed in the beadroll. This forced the revolutionaries to launch the uprising earlier than planned.

On the night of October 10, the revolutionaries fired shots to signal the uprising at the engineering barracks of Hubei New Army. They then led the New Army of all barracks to join the revolution. Under the guidance of Wu Zhaolin, Cai Jimin and others, this revolutionary army seized the official residence of the governor and government offices. Rui Cheng fled in panic into the Chuyu ship. Zhang Biao, the commander of the Qing army, also fled the city. On the morning of the 11th, the revolutionary army took the whole city of Wuchang, but leaders such as Jiang Yiwu and Sun Wu disappeared. Thus the leaderless revolutionary army recommended Li Yuanhong, the assistant governor of the Qing army, as the commander-in-chief. Li founded the Hubei Military Government, proclaimed the abolition of the Qing rule in Hubei, the founding of the Republic of China and published an open telegram calling for other provinces to join the revolution.

As the revolution spread to other parts of the country, the Qing government concentrated loyalist military forces to suppress the uprising in Wuhan. From October 17 to December 1, the revolutionary army and local volunteers defended the city in the Battle of Yangxia against better armed and more numerous Qing forces commanded by Yuan Shikai. Huang Xing would arrive in Wuhan in early November to take command of the revolutionary army. After fierce fighting and heavy casualties, Qing forces seized Hankou and Hanyang. But Yuan agreed to halt the advance on Wuchang and participated in peace talks, which would eventually lead to the return of Sun Yat-sen from exile, founding of the Republic of China on January 1, 1912. Through the Wuchang Uprising, Wuhan is known as the birthplace of the Xinhai Revolution, named after the Xinhai year on the Chinese calendar. The city has several museums and memorials to the revolution and the thousands of martyrs who died defending the revolution.

=== Republic of China ===
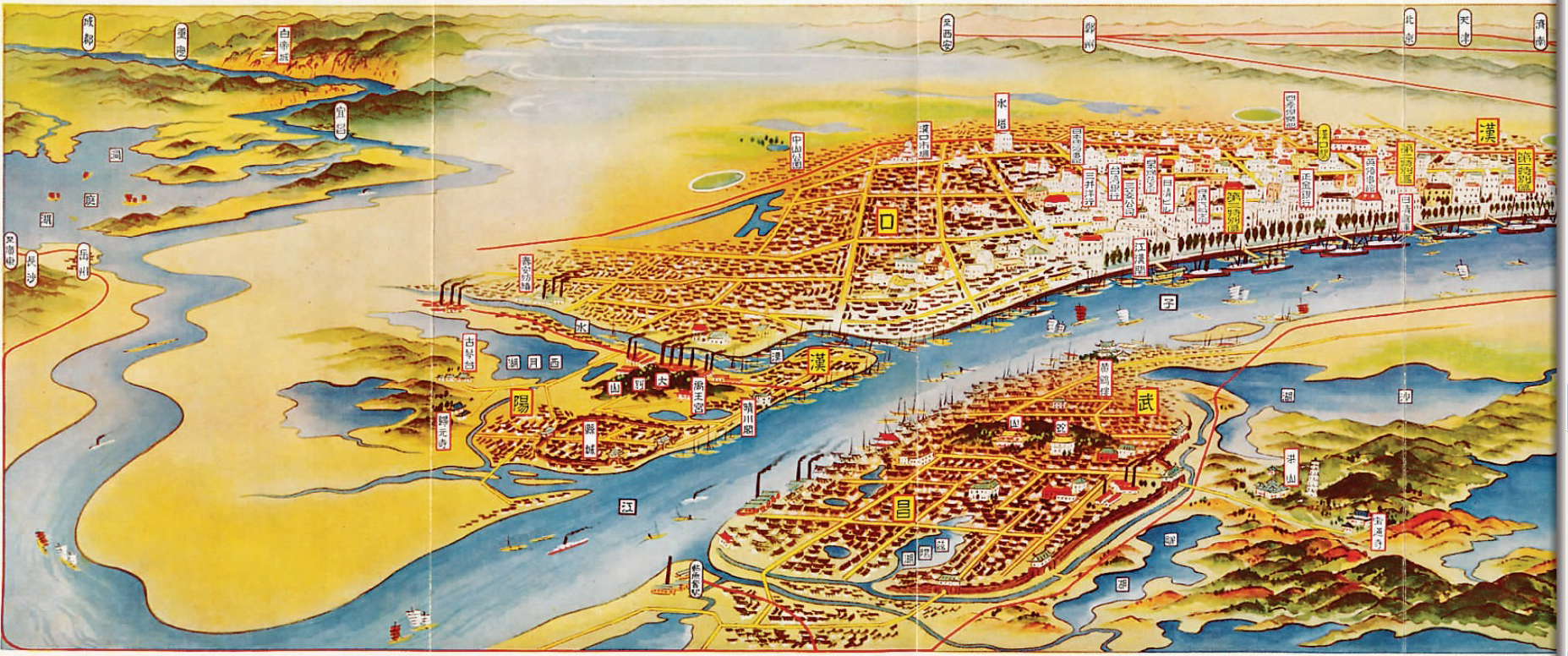
A map of Wuhan painted by the Japanese in 1930, with Hankou being the most prosperous sector

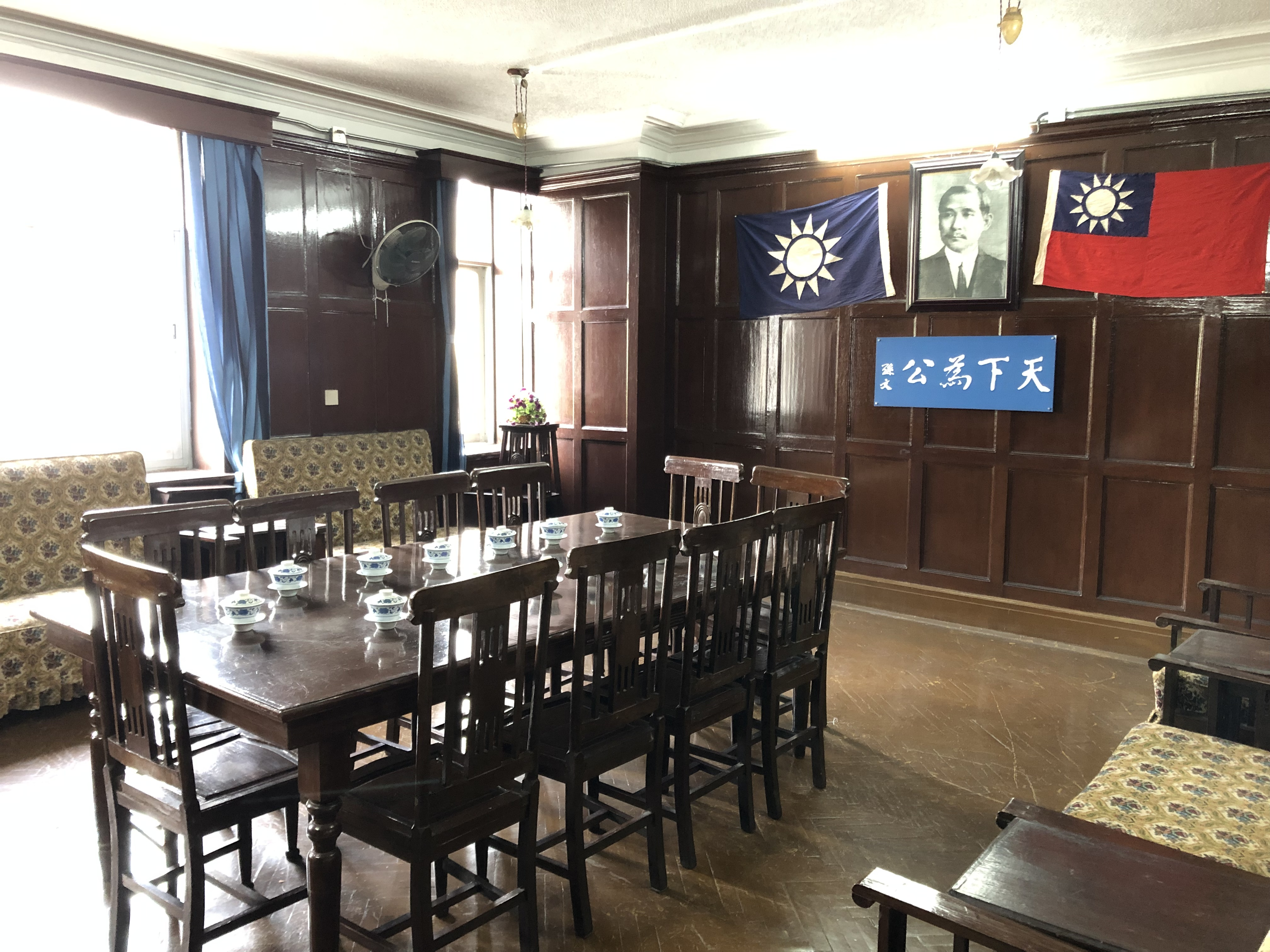
Nanyang Building Interior

With the northern extension of the Northern Expedition, the center of the Great Revolution shifted from the Pearl River basin to the Yangtze River basin. On November 26, the Kuomintang Central Political Committee decided to move the capital from Guangzhou to Wuhan. In mid-December, most of the KMT central executive commissioners and national government commissioners arrived in Wuhan, set up the temporary joint conference of central executive commissioners and National Government commissioners, performed the top functions of central party headquarters and National Government, declared they would work in Wuhan on January 1, 1927, and decided to combine the towns of Wuchang, Hankou, and Hanyang into Wuhan City, called "Capital District". The new national government, later known as "Wuhan nationalist government", was based in the Nanyang Building in Hankou, while the central party headquarters and other organizations chose their locations in Hankou or Wuchang.

In March 1927, Mao Zedong appeared at the Third Plenum of the KMT Central Executive Committee in Wuhan, which sought to strip General Chiang of his power by appointing Wang Jingwei leader. The first phase of the Northern Expedition was interrupted by the political split in the Kuomintang following the formation of the Nanjing faction in April 1927 against the existing faction in Wuhan. Members of the Chinese Communist Party, who had survived the April 12 massacre, met at Wuhan and reelected Chen Duxiu (Ch'en Tu-hsiu) as the Party's Secretary General. The split was partially motivated by the purge of the Communists within the party, which marked the end of the First United Front, and Chiang Kai-shek briefly stepped down as the commander of the National Revolutionary Army.

In June 1927, Stalin sent a telegram to the Communists in Wuhan, calling for the mobilization of an army of workers and peasants. This alarmed Wang Jingwei, who decided to break with the Communists and come to terms with Chiang Kai-shek. The Wuhan coup was a political shift made on July 15, 1927, by Wang Jingwei towards Chiang Kai-shek, and his Shanghai-based rival in the Kuomintang. The Wuhan Nationalist Government was established in Wuhan on February 21, 1927, and ended by August 19, 1927. After the end of the Northern Expedition, Hankou was elevated to a centrally-controlled municipality.

In the 1931 China floods, one of the deadliest flood disasters in world history, Wuhan was a refuge for flood victims from outlying areas, who had been arriving since the late spring. But when the city itself was inundated in the early summer, and after a catastrophic dike failure just before 6:00 AM on July 27, an estimated 782,189 urban citizens and rural refugees were left homeless. The flood covered an area of 32 square miles and the city was flooded under many feet of water for close to three months. Large numbers gathered on flood islands throughout the city, with 30,000 sheltering on a railway embankment in central Hankou. With little food and a complete breakdown in sanitation, thousands soon began to succumb to diseases. Jin Shilong, Senior Engineer at the Hubei Flood Prevention Agency, described the flooding:

There was no warning, only a sudden great wall of water. Most of Wuhan's buildings in those days were only one story high, and for many people there was no escape – they died by the tens of thousands. ... I was just coming off duty at the company's main office, a fairly new three-story building near the center of town ... When I heard the terrible noise and saw the wall of water coming, I raced to the top story of the building. ... I was in one of the tallest and strongest buildings left standing. At that time no one knew whether the water would subside or rise even higher.

The high-water mark was reached on August 19 at Hankou, with the water level exceeding 16 m (53 ft) above normal. In 1936, when natural disaster struck Central China with widespread flooding affecting Hebei, Hunan, Jiangxi, Wuhan and Chongqing caused by the Yangtze and Huai Rivers bursting their banks, Ong Seok Kim, as Chairman of the Sitiawan Fundraising and Disaster Relief Committee, raised money and materials in support of the victims.

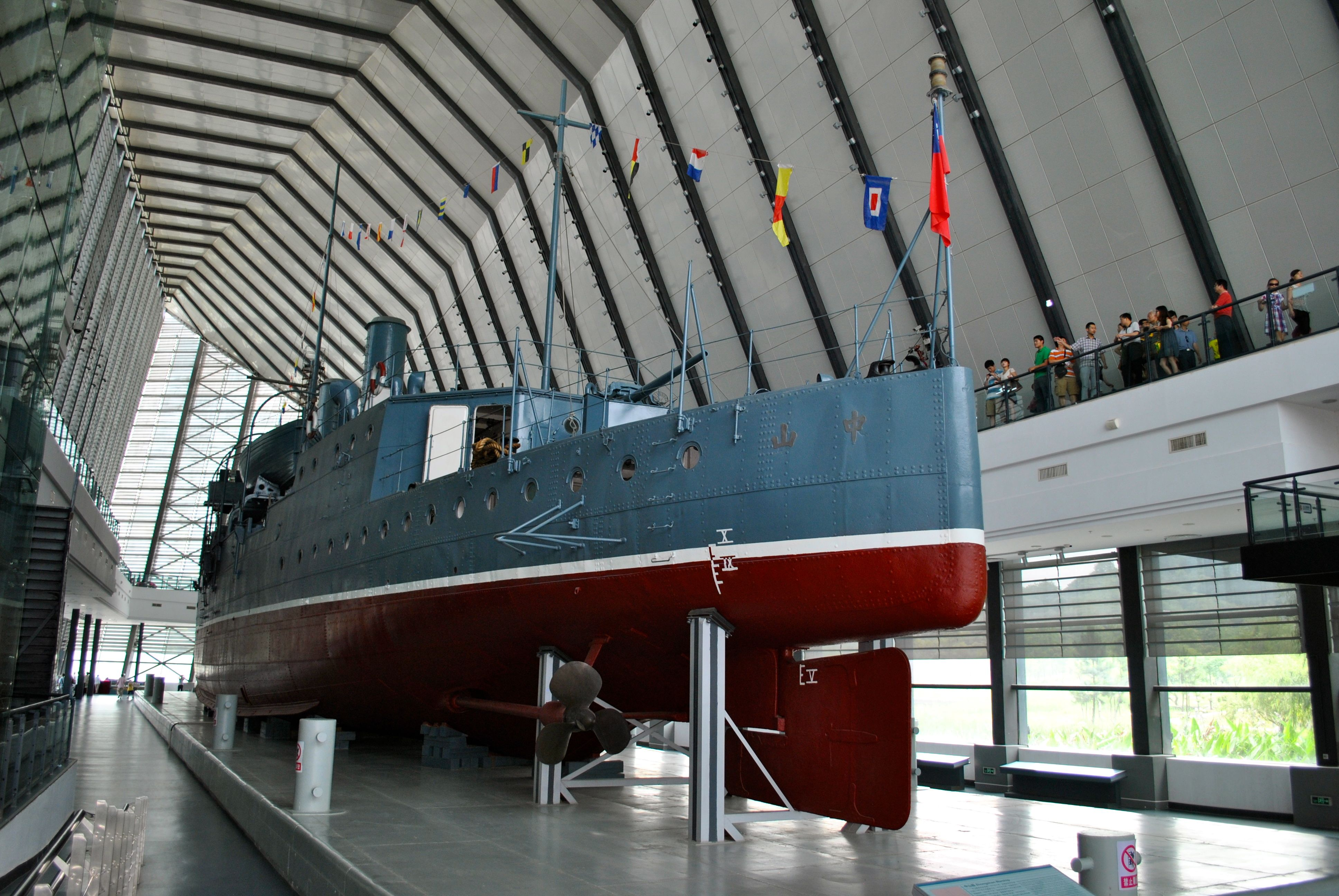
The gunboat Zhongshan

During the Second Sino-Japanese War and following the fall of Nanking in December 1937, Wuhan had become the provisional capital of China's Kuomintang government, and became another focal point of pitched air battles beginning in early 1938 between modern monoplane bomber and fighter aircraft of the Imperial Japanese forces and the Chinese Air Force, which included support from the Soviet Volunteer Group in both planes and personnel, as U.S. support in war materials waned. As the battle raged on through 1938, Wuhan and the surrounding region had become the site of the Battle of Wuhan. After being taken by the Japanese in late 1938, Wuhan became a major Japanese logistics center for operations in southern China. In early October 1938, Japanese troops moved east and north in the outskirts of Wuhan. As a result, numerous companies and enterprises and large numbers of people had to withdraw from Wuhan to the west of Hubei and Sichuan. The KMT navy undertook the responsibility of defending the Yangtze River on patrol and covering the withdrawal. On October 24, while overseeing the waters of the Yangtze River near the town of Jinkou (Jiangxia District in Wuhan) in Wuchang, the KMT gunboat Zhongshan came up against six Japanese aircraft. Though two were eventually shot down, the Zhongshan sank with 25 casualties. Raised from the bottom of the Yangtze River in 1997, and restored at a local shipyard, the Zhongshan has been moved to a purpose-built museum in Wuhan's suburban Jiangxia District, which opened on September 26, 2011.

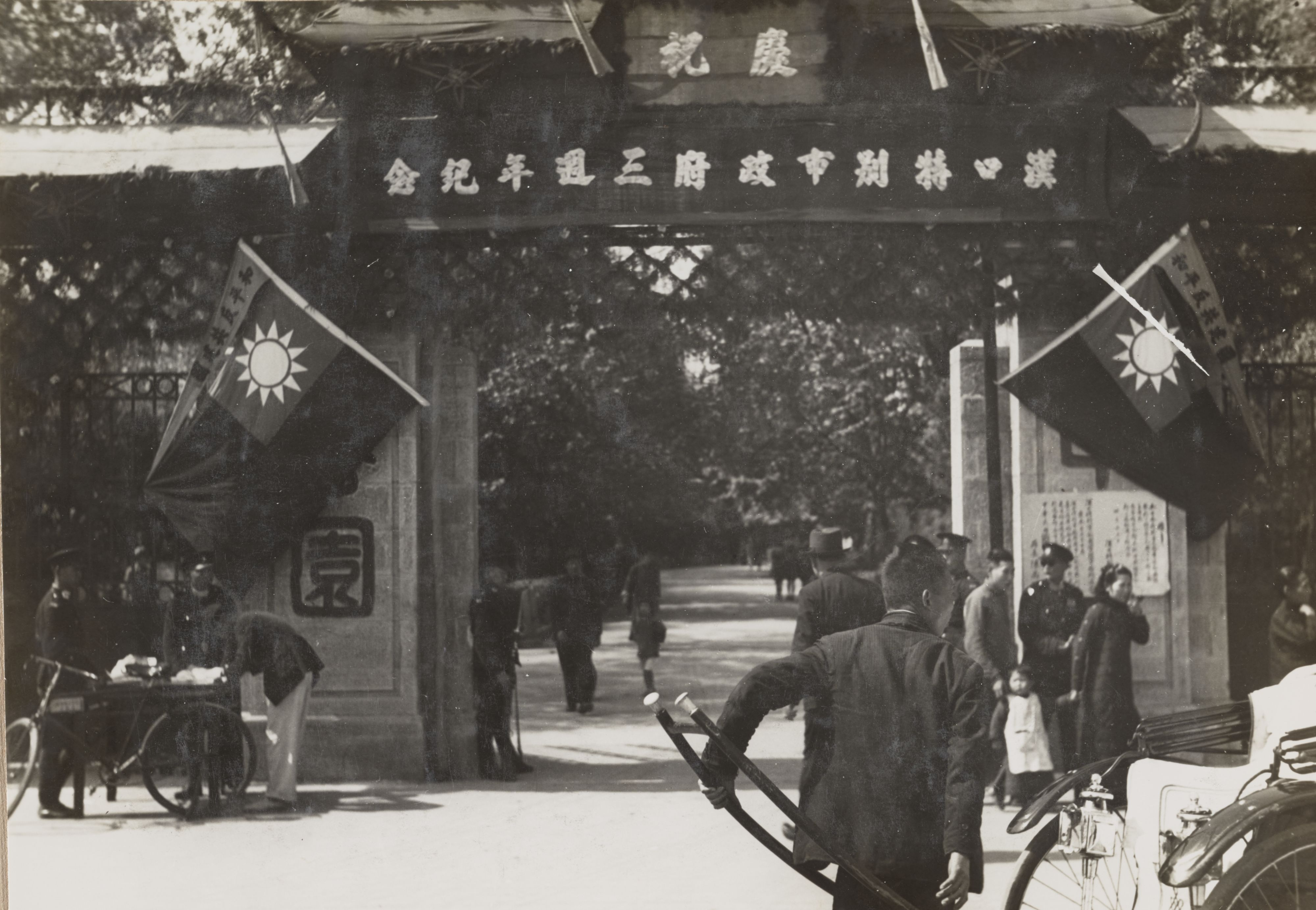
A park in Wuhan festooned to mark the third anniversary of the founding of the Hankou Municipal Government, March 1943.

As a key center on the Yangtze, Wuhan was an important base for Japanese operations in China. On December 18, 1944, in a planned strategic move, and as revenge for the torture and execution of three captured American pilots by Japanese soldiers in the city, Wuhan was bombed by 77 American bombers with the approval of Chiang Kai-Shek. This set off a firestorm that destroyed much of the military resources of the city. For the next three days, Wuhan was bombed by the Americans, destroying all of the docks and warehouses of Wuhan, as well as the Japanese air bases in the city. The air raids also killed thousands of Chinese civilians. "According to casualty statistics compiled by Hankou city in 1946, more than 20,000 were killed or injured in the December bombings of 1944."

Wuhan returned to Chinese control in September 1945. Administratively, Wuchang and Hanyang were initially combined into a new City of Wuchang, but in October 1946 were separated into the City of Wuchang (including Wuchang only) and the County of Hanyang. Hankou became a centrally controlled municipality in August 1947. Militarily, the Wuhan Forward Headquarters was established in Wuhan, headed by Bai Chongxi.

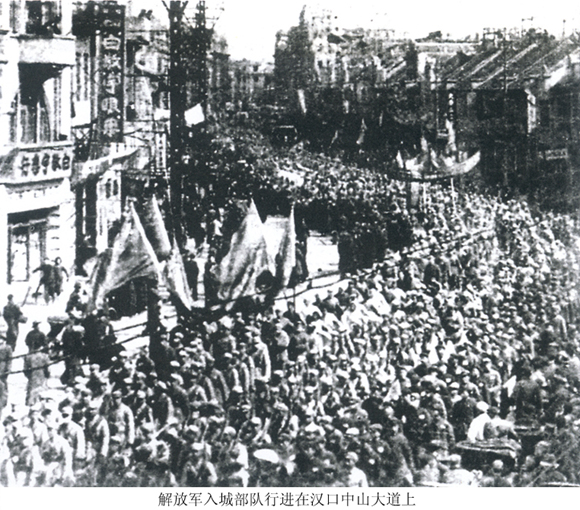
People's Liberation Army troops at Zhongshan Avenue, Hankou on May 16, 1949

During the later stages of the Chinese Civil War, Bai sought to broker peace, proposing that the Communist Party could rule northern China while the Nationalist government retained southern China. This was rejected, and on May 15, 1949, Bai and the Wuhan garrison retreated from the city. People's Liberation Army troops entered Wuhan on the afternoon of Monday, May 16, 1949.

=== People's Republic of China ===
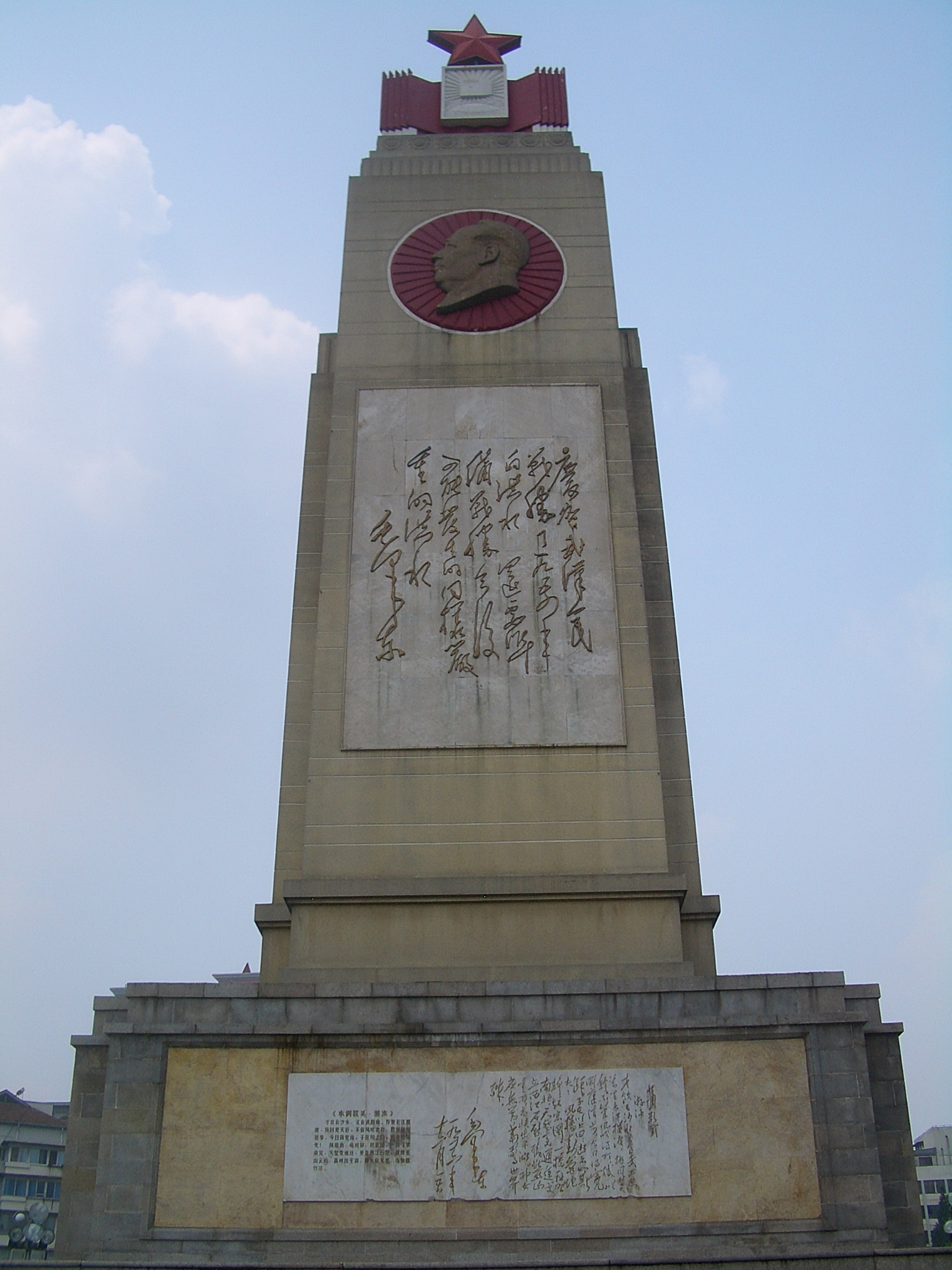
In his poem "Swimming" (1956), engraved on the 1954 Flood Memorial in Wuhan, Mao Zedong envisions "walls of stone" to be erected upstream.

The Communists redeveloped industry in Wuhan, which had been damaged by war. During the PRC's first decade, it became an important center of industry again. Hundreds of factories were built in the city, including most prominently Wuhan Iron and Steel, which opened in 1958.

The Changjiang Water Resources Commission was reestablished in February 1950 with its headquarters in Wuhan. From June to September 1954, the Yangtze River Floods were a series of catastrophic floodings that occurred mostly in Hubei Province. Due to an unusually high volume of precipitation as well as an extraordinarily long rainy season in the middle stretch of the Yangtze River late in the spring of 1954, the river started to rise above its usual level in around late June. In 1969, a large stone monument was erected in the riverside park in Hankou honoring the heroic deeds in fighting the 1954 Yangtze River floods.

Before construction of the Wuhan Yangtze River Bridge, Hunslet Engine Company built two extra heavy 0-8-0 locomotives for loading the train ferries for crossing the Yangtze River in Wuhan.

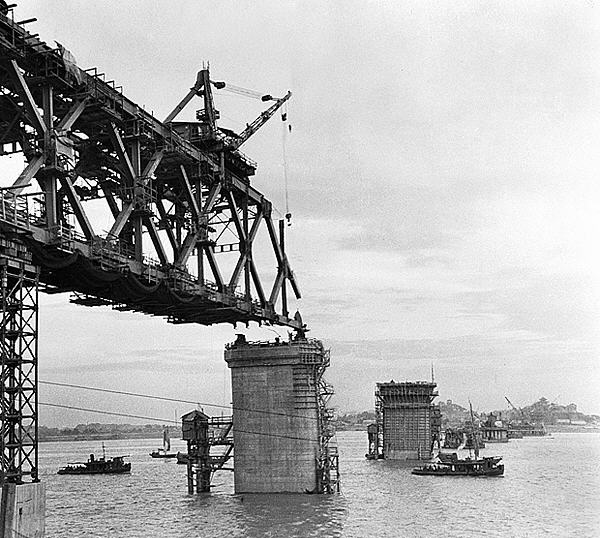
Wuhan Yangtze River Bridge during Construction

The project of building the Wuhan Yangtze River Bridge, also known as the First Yangtze River Bridge, was regarded as one of the key projects during the first five-year plan. On October 25, 1955, construction began on the bridge proper. The same day in 1957, the whole project was completed and an opening-to-traffic ceremony was held on October 15. The First Yangtze River Bridge united the Beijing–Hankou railway with the Guangdong–Hankou railway into the Beijing–Guangzhou railway, making Wuhan a 'thoroughfare to nine provinces' (九省通衢) in name and in fact.

After Chengdu Conference, Mao went to Chongqing and Wuhan in April to inspect the countryside and factories. In Wuhan, he called all the leaders of provinces and municipalities who had not attended Chengdu Conference to report their work. Tian Jiaying, the secretary of Mao, said that Wuhan Conference was a supplement to Chengdu Conference.

As the Third Front campaign shifted the focus of industrial development to China's hinterlands, Wuhan's development slowed.

In July 1967, civil strife struck the city in the Wuhan Incident ("July 20th Incident"), an armed conflict between two hostile groups who were fighting for control over the city at the height of the Cultural Revolution. Economic development was further disrupted by the Cultural Revolution.

In 1981, the Wuhan City Government commenced reconstruction of the Yellow Crane Tower at a new location, about 1 km (0.62 mi) from the original site, and it was completed in 1985. In 1957, the Wuhan Yangtze River Bridge was built with one trestle of the bridge on the site of the tower, which had been last destroyed in 1884.

During the 1989 Tiananmen Square protests, students in Wuhan blocked the Yangtze River Railway bridge and another 4,000 gathered at the railway station. About one thousand students staged a railroad 'sit-in'. Rail traffic on the Beijing-Guangzhou and Wuhan-Dalian lines was interrupted. The students also urged employees of major state-owned enterprises to go on strike. The situation was so tense that residents reportedly began a bank run and resorted to panic-buying.

Wuhan was the first stop on Deng Xiaoping's 1992 southern tour.

In the wake of the United States bombing of the Chinese embassy in Belgrade on May 7, 1999, protests broke out throughout China, including in Wuhan.

On June 22, 2000, a Wuhan Airlines flight from Enshi to Wuhan was forced to circle for 30 minutes due to thunderstorms. The aircraft eventually crashed on the banks of Han River in Hanyang District, all on-board perished (there were varying accounts of number of crews and passengers). In addition, the crash also killed 7 people on the ground.

Chinese protesters organized boycotts of the French-owned retail chain Carrefour in major Chinese cities including Kunming, Hefei and Wuhan, accusing the French nation of pro-secessionist conspiracy and anti-Chinese racism. The BBC reported that hundreds of people demonstrated in Beijing, Wuhan, Hefei, Kunming and Qingdao. On May 19, 2011, Fang Binxing, the Principal of Beijing University of Posts and Telecommunications (also known as "Father of China's Great Fire Wall") was hit on the chest by a shoe thrown at him by a Huazhong University of Science and Technology student who calls herself "hanjunyi" (寒君依, or 小湖北) while Fang was giving a lecture at Wuhan University.

Jiangtan street along Yangze river

The city has been subject to devastating floods, which are now intended to be controlled by the ambitious Three Gorges Dam, a project which was completed in 2008. The 2008 Chinese winter storms damaged water supply equipment in Wuhan: up to 100,000 people were out of running water when several water pipes burst, cutting the supply to local households. The 2010 Northern Hemisphere summer heat wave hit Wuhan on July 3. In the 2010 China floods, the Han River at Wuhan experienced its worst flooding in twenty years, as officials continued sandbagging efforts along the Han and Yangtze Rivers in the city and checked reservoirs. In the 2011 China floods, Wuhan was flooded, with parts of the city losing power. In the 2016 China floods, Wuhan saw 570 mm (22 in) of rainfall during the first week of July, surpassing the record that fell on the city in 1991. A red alert for heavy rainfall was issued on July 2, the same day that eight people died after a 15-meter (49 ft) section of a 2 m (6.6 ft) tall wall collapsed on top of them. The city's subway system, the Wuhan Metro was partially submerged as was the main railway station. At least 14 city residents were killed, one was missing, and more than 80,000 were relocated.

The 2019 Military World Games were hosted in Wuhan in October.

In December 2019, SARS-CoV-2, a novel coronavirus that caused the COVID-19 pandemic, was first discovered in Wuhan, and the city was the location of the first lockdown of the pandemic in January 2020. Wuhan and other Hubei cities were placed under lockdown for nearly three months to contain the disease. On April 8, 2020, the Wuhan lockdown officially came to an end after no new domestic cases were reported in Hubei province. SARS-CoV-2 is believed to have resulted from the zoonotic spillover of a virus that existed in bats, and the Huanan Seafood Market in Wuhan has been identified as a potential site for the initial animal-to-human transmission. Although no bats were sold at the market, some 38 other species of animals were offered at wet markets in the city, one of which could have served as an intermediary species.

== Geography ==
=== Overview ===
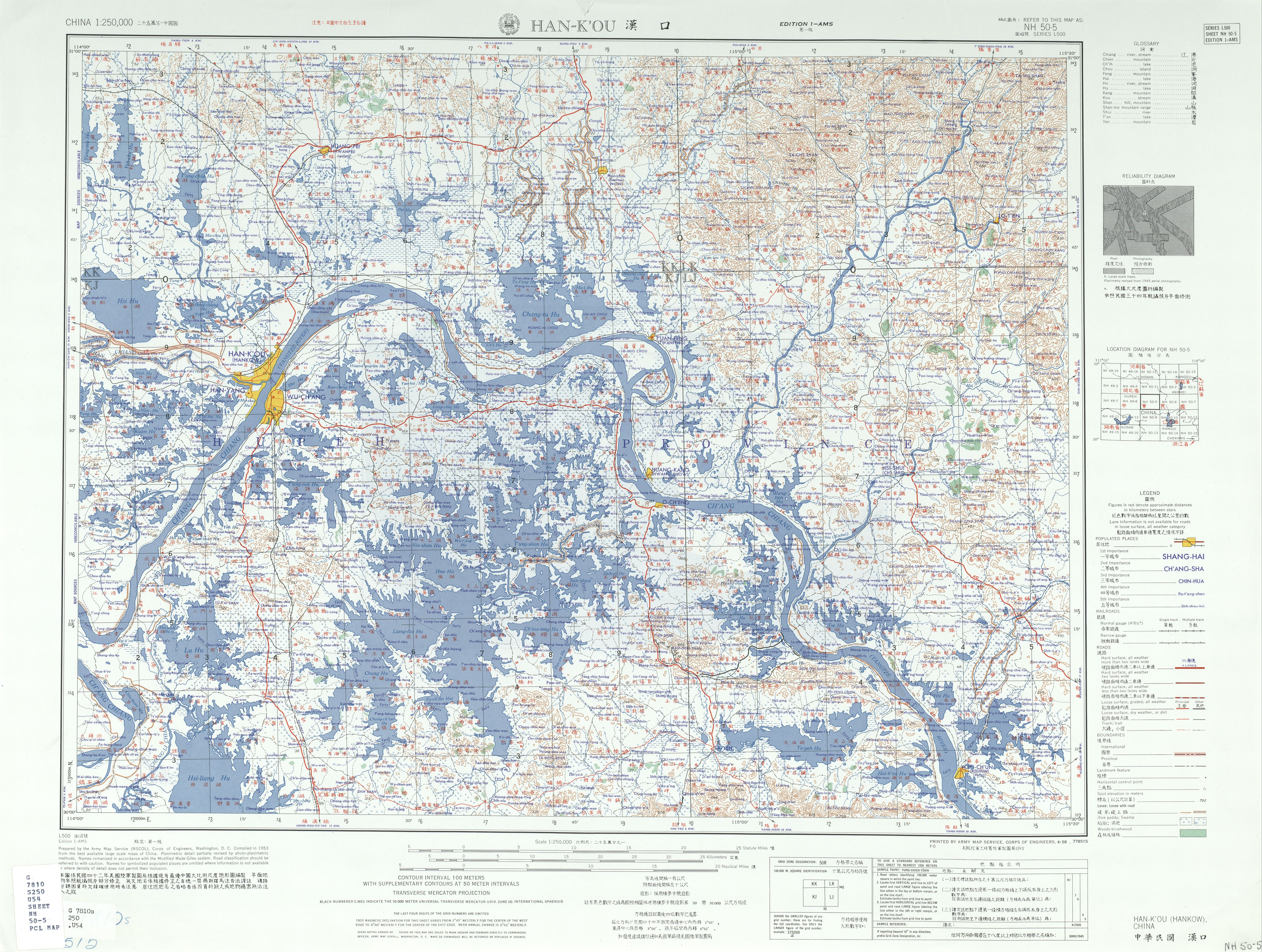
Map including the Wuhan area (AMS, 1953)

Wuhan is in east-central Hubei, at latitude 29° 58'–31° 22' N and longitude 113° 41'–115° 05' E. Wuhan sits at the confluence of the Han River flowing into the Yangtze River at the East of the Jianghan Plain along the Yangtze's middle reaches.

The metropolitan area comprises three parts—Wuchang, Hankou, and Hanyang—commonly called the "Three Towns of Wuhan" (hence the name "Wuhan", combining "Wu" from the first city and "Han" from the other two). The consolidation of these cities occurred in 1927 and Wuhan was thereby established. The three former cities face each other across the rivers and are linked by bridges, including one of the first modern bridges in China, known as the "First Bridge".

- Wuchang lies south east of the Yangtze River that separates it from both Hankou and Hanyang.
- Hankou sits north of the Yangtze River separating it from Wuchang. Hankou is north of the Han River separating it from Hanyang.
- Hanyang lies west of the Yangtze separating it from Wuchang. Hanyang is south of the Han river separating it from Hankou.

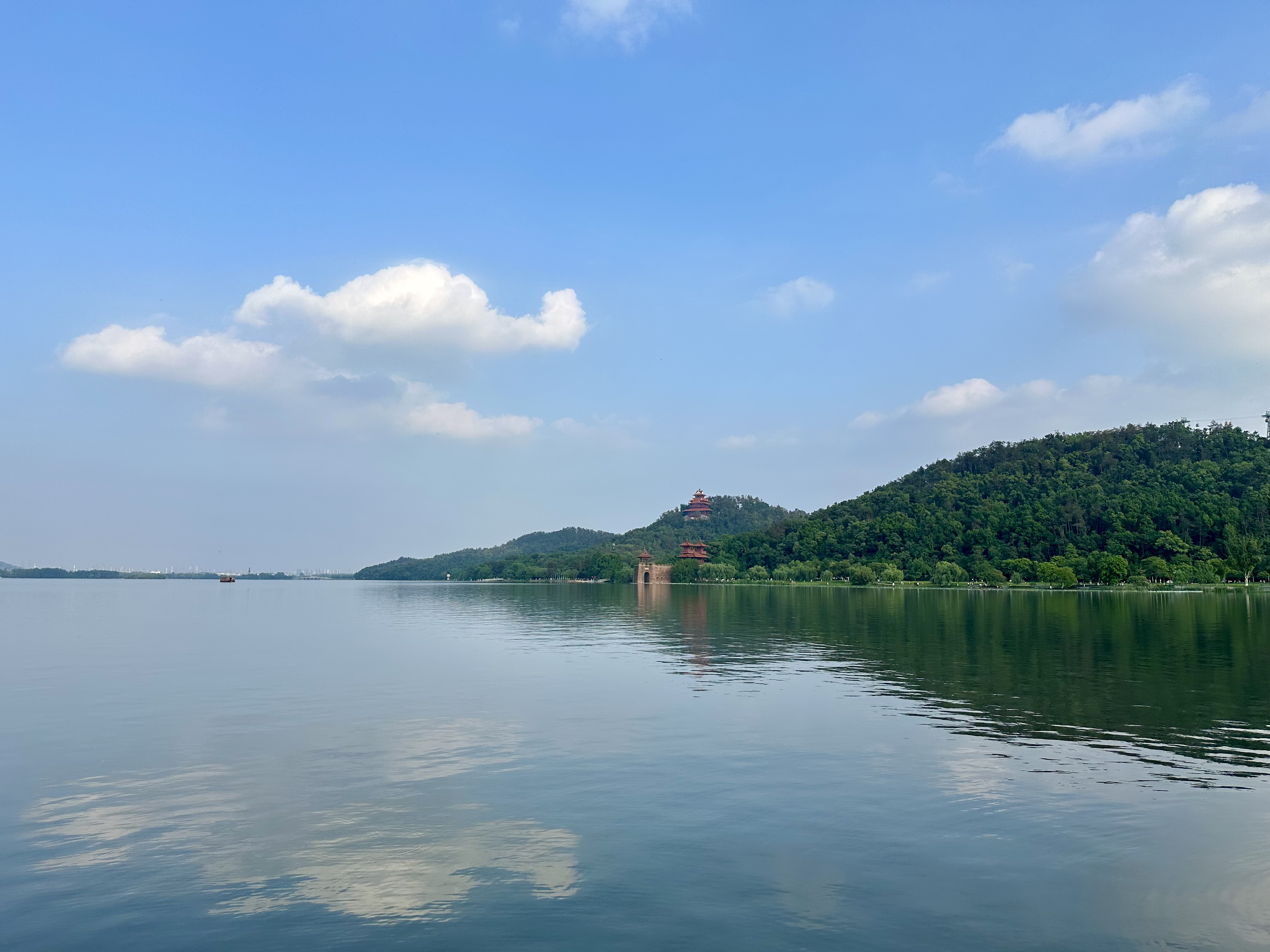
East Lake

It is simple in terrain—low and flat in the middle and hilly in the south, with the Yangtze and Han rivers winding through the city. The She River enters the Yangtze in Huangpi District. Wuhan occupies a land area of 8,494.41 square kilometers (3,279.71 sq mi), most of which is alluvial plain and decorated with hills and a great number of lakes and ponds. Water makes up one quarter of Wuhan's urban territory, which is the highest percentage among major cities in China. Wuhan has nearly 200 lakes, including the East Lake of 33 km2, and Tangxun Lake, which are the largest lakes entirely within a city in China.

Other well-known lakes include South Lake and Sand Lake. Liangzi Lake, the largest lake by surface area in Hubei province, is located in the southeast of Jiangxia District.The twin peaks at the junction of Huangpi District and Xiaogan City, with an altitude of 872.5 meters, are the highest points in Wuhan. There are also several mountains within the city limits of Wuhan including Mount Luojia (珞珈山) in Wuchang District as well as Mount Hong (洪山) and Mount Yujia (喻家山/瑜珈山) in Hongshan District.

=== Climate ===
Wuhan's climate is humid subtropical (Köppen Cfa) with abundant rainfall in summer and four distinctive seasons. Wuhan is known for its humid summers, when dewpoints can often reach 26 °C (79 °F) or more. Historically, along with Chongqing and Nanjing, Wuhan is referred to as one of the "Three Furnacelike Cities" along the Yangtze River for their hot summers. However, the climate data of recent years suggests that Wuhan is no longer among the top tier of "The hottest cities in summer" list, the New Four Furnacelike Cities are Chongqing, Fuzhou, Hangzhou, and Nanchang. Spring and autumn are generally mild, while winter is cool with quite low rainfall and occasional snow. The monthly 24-hour average temperature ranges from 4.1 °C (39.4 °F) in January to 29.3 °C (84.7 °F) in July. Annual precipitation totals just under 1,320 mm (52 in), the majority of which falls from April to July. The annual mean temperature is 17.4 °C (63.3 °F), while the frost-free period lasts 211 to 272 days. With monthly possible sunshine percentage ranging from 30 percent in January to 53 percent in August, the city proper receives 1,783 hours of bright sunshine annually. Extreme low and high temperatures recorded are −18.1 °C (−1 °F) on January 31, 1977, and 39.7 °C (103 °F) on July 27, 2017 / on August 18, 2022 (unofficial record of 41.3 °C (106 °F) on August 10, 1934).

Climate data for Wuhan, elevation 24 m (79 ft), (1991–2020 normals, extremes 1951–present)
Month	Jan	Feb	Mar	Apr	May	Jun	Jul	Aug	Sep	Oct	Nov	Dec	Year
Record high °C (°F)	25.4 (77.7)	29.1 (84.4)	34.0 (93.2)	35.1 (95.2)	36.1 (97.0)	37.8 (100.0)	39.7 (103.5)	39.7 (103.5)	38.6 (101.5)	37.9 (100.2)	30.4 (86.7)	24.2 (75.6)	39.7 (103.5)
Mean maximum °C (°F)	16.4 (61.5)	20.8 (69.4)	25.5 (77.9)	29.8 (85.6)	32.9 (91.2)	35.1 (95.2)	37.3 (99.1)	37.7 (99.9)	35.1 (95.2)	30.7 (87.3)	24.3 (75.7)	18.2 (64.8)	38.3 (100.9)
Mean daily maximum °C (°F)	8.3 (46.9)	11.4 (52.5)	16.3 (61.3)	22.7 (72.9)	27.3 (81.1)	30.4 (86.7)	33.2 (91.8)	32.8 (91.0)	28.9 (84.0)	23.3 (73.9)	17.1 (62.8)	10.8 (51.4)	21.9 (71.4)
Daily mean °C (°F)	4.1 (39.4)	7.0 (44.6)	11.6 (52.9)	17.8 (64.0)	22.7 (72.9)	26.3 (79.3)	29.3 (84.7)	28.6 (83.5)	24.3 (75.7)	18.3 (64.9)	12.0 (53.6)	6.2 (43.2)	17.4 (63.2)
Mean daily minimum °C (°F)	1.0 (33.8)	3.6 (38.5)	7.9 (46.2)	13.7 (56.7)	18.8 (65.8)	23.0 (73.4)	26.2 (79.2)	25.4 (77.7)	20.8 (69.4)	14.8 (58.6)	8.4 (47.1)	2.8 (37.0)	13.9 (57.0)
Mean minimum °C (°F)	−5.4 (22.3)	−3.1 (26.4)	1.1 (34.0)	6.8 (44.2)	12.8 (55.0)	18.2 (64.8)	22.4 (72.3)	22.1 (71.8)	16.1 (61.0)	9.3 (48.7)	2.2 (36.0)	−3.3 (26.1)	−6.5 (20.3)
Record low °C (°F)	−18.1 (−0.6)	−14.8 (5.4)	−5.0 (23.0)	−0.3 (31.5)	7.2 (45.0)	13.0 (55.4)	17.3 (63.1)	16.4 (61.5)	10.1 (50.2)	1.3 (34.3)	−7.1 (19.2)	−10.1 (13.8)	−18.1 (−0.6)
Average precipitation mm (inches)	52.5 (2.07)	66.4 (2.61)	91.0 (3.58)	137.5 (5.41)	160.6 (6.32)	212.9 (8.38)	255.5 (10.06)	106.3 (4.19)	72.2 (2.84)	66.4 (2.61)	58.2 (2.29)	30.7 (1.21)	1,310.2 (51.57)
Average precipitation days (≥ 0.1 mm)	9.7	9.9	12.6	11.6	12.5	12.0	11.1	9.7	7.7	8.5	9.1	7.2	121.6
Average snowy days	4.3	2.4	0.9	0	0	0	0	0	0	0	0.4	1.4	9.4
Average relative humidity (%)	76	76	75	74	74	78	76	77	75	76	77	74	76
Mean monthly sunshine hours	95.4	97.8	126.4	152.5	165.9	155.8	210.9	214.8	166.0	149.1	132.1	116.7	1,783.4
Percentage possible sunshine	30	31	34	39	39	37	49	53	45	43	37	40	40

== Government and politics ==
Wuhan is a sub-provincial city. Municipal government is regulated by the local Chinese Communist Party (CCP), led by the Wuhan Party Secretary (Chinese: 武汉市委书记), Wang Zhonglin (王忠林). The local CCP issues administrative orders, collects taxes, manages the economy, and directs a standing committee of the Municipal People's Congress in making policy decisions and overseeing the local government.

Government officials include the Mayor of Wuhan (市长), Cheng Yongwen (程用文), and vice-mayors. Numerous bureaus focus on law, public security, and other affairs. Zhou Xianwang (周先旺) was mayor from 2018 to 2021.

=== Administrative divisions ===
The sub-provincial city of Wuhan currently comprises 13 districts. As of the Sixth Census of China in 2010, the 13 districts comprised 160 township-level divisions including 156 subdistricts, 3 towns, 1 townships. The municipal seat is Jiang'an.

Map	District	Chinese (S)	Pinyin	Population (2010 census)	Area (km^{2})	Density (/km^{2})
	Central Districts			6,434,373	888.42	7,242
	Jiang'an	江岸区	Jiāng'àn Qū	895,635	64.24	13,942
	Jianghan	江汉区	Jiānghàn Qū	683,492	33.43	20,445
	Qiaokou	硚口区	Qiáokǒu Qū	828,644	46.39	17,863
	Hanyang	汉阳区	Hànyáng Qū	792,183	108.34	7,312
	Wuchang	武昌区	Wǔchāng Qū	1,199,127	87.42	13,717
	Qingshan	青山区	Qīngshān Qū	485,375	68.40	7,096
	Hongshan	洪山区	Hóngshān Qū	1,549,917	480.20	3,228
	Suburban and Rural Districts			3,346,271	7,605.99	440
	Dongxihu	东西湖区	Dōngxīhú Qū	451,880	439.19	1,029
	Hannan	汉南区	Hànnán Qū	114,970	287.70	400
	Caidian	蔡甸区	Càidiàn Qū	410,888	1,108.10	371
	Jiangxia	江夏区	Jiāngxià Qū	644,835	2,010.00	321
	Huangpi	黄陂区	Huángpí Qū	874,938	2,261.00	387
	Xinzhou	新洲区	Xīnzhōu Qū	848,760	1,500.00	566
	Water Region (水域)			4,748	-	-
	Total			9,785,392	8,494.41	1,152

=== Diplomatic missions ===
There are four countries that have consulates in Wuhan:

Consulate	Year	Consular District
France Consulate General Wuhan	October 10, 1998	Hubei/Hunan/Jiangxi
United States Consulate General Wuhan	November 20, 2008	Hubei/Hunan/Henan/Jiangxi
Republic of Korea Consulate General Wuhan	October 25, 2010	Hubei/Hunan/Henan/Jiangxi
United Kingdom Consulate General Wuhan	January 8, 2015	Hubei/Henan

The current U.S. Consul General, Jamie Fouss, was posted to Wuhan in August 2017. The office of the U.S. Consulate General, Central China (located in Wuhan) celebrated its official opening on November 20, 2008, and is the first new American consulate in China in over 20 years.

In 2015, Japan and Russia announced their intentions to establish consular offices in Wuhan.

== Economy ==
Up until the 21st century, Wuhan was largely an agricultural region. Since 2004 it has been a focal point of the Rise of Central China Plan, which aims to build less-developed inland economies into hubs of advanced manufacturing.

Since 1890, the steel industry has been the backbone of Wuhan's industry. In 2010, automobile industry exceeded GDP for Wuhan Iron and Steel Corporation (WISCO) steel for the first time. There are 5 car manufacturers, including Dongfeng Honda, Citroën, SAIC-GM, DFM Passenger Vehicle and Dongfeng Renault. Dongfeng-Citroen Automobile Co., Ltd is headquartered in the city.

As of 2016, Wuhan has attracted foreign investment from over 80 countries, with 5,973 foreign-invested enterprises established in the city with a total capital injection of $22.45 billion USD. Among these, about 50 French companies including Renault and PSA Group have operations in the city, representing over one third of French investment in China, and the highest level of French investment in any Chinese city.

Wuhan is an important center for economy, trade, finance, transportation, information technology, and education in China. Its major industries include optic-electronic, automobile manufacturing, iron and steel manufacturing, new pharmaceutical sector, biology engineering, new materials industry and environmental protection. Environmental sustainability is highlighted in Wuhan's list of emerging industries, which include energy efficiency technology and renewable energy.

As of 2021, Wuhan is ranked among the world's top 100 financial centers, according to the Global Financial Centres Index.

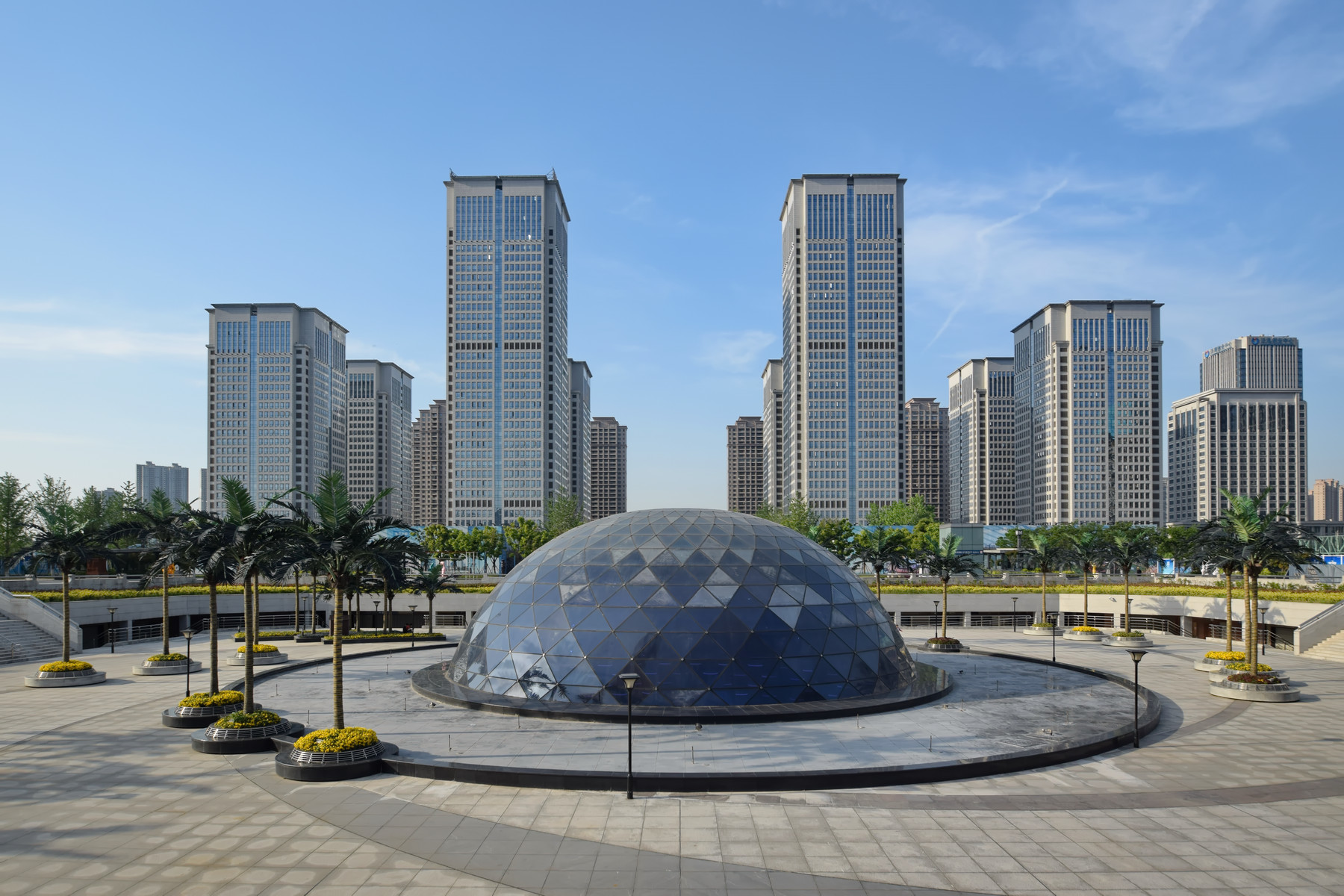
Wuhan CBD

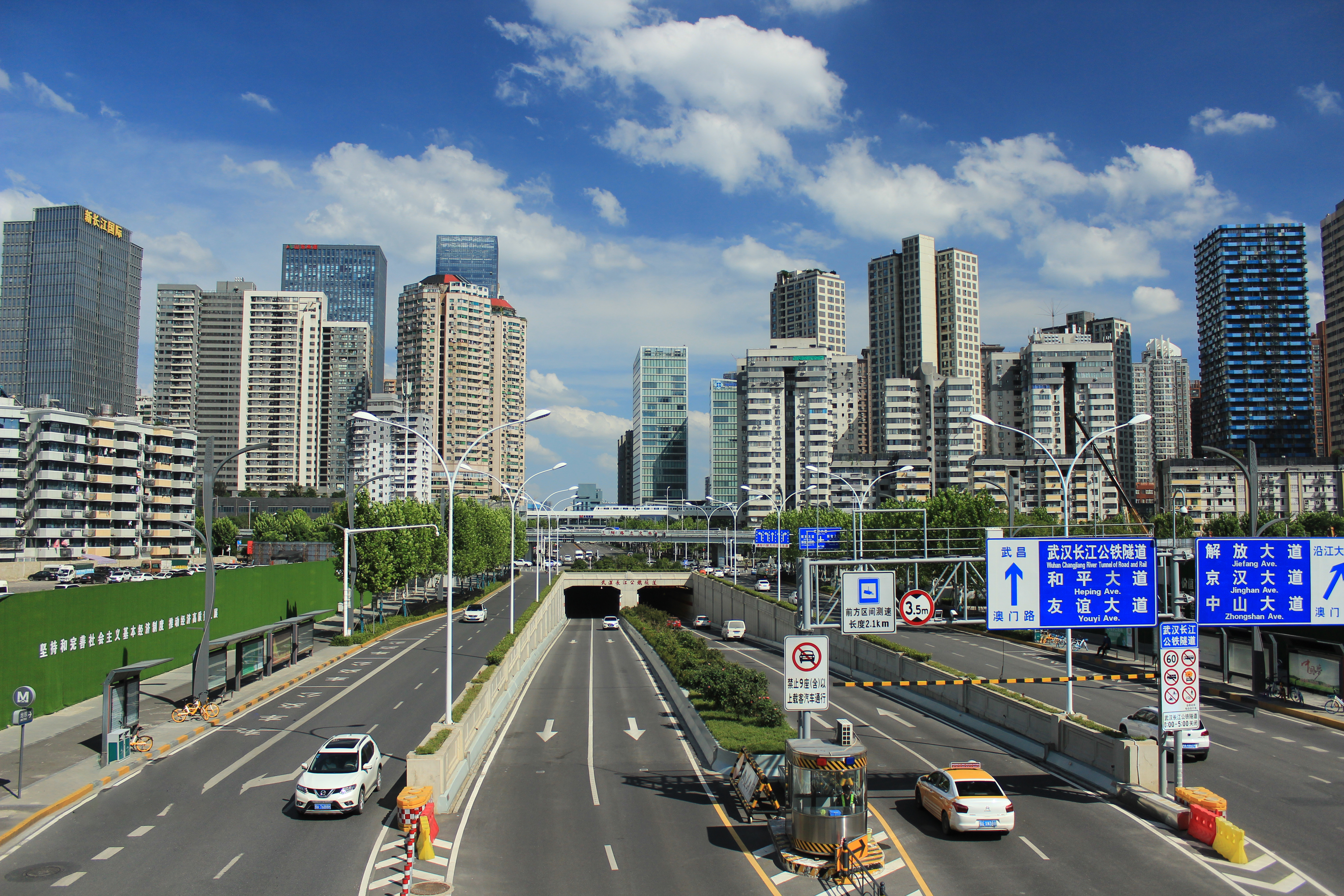
Wuhan Yangtze River Tunnel of Road and Rail

=== Industrial zones ===
Major industrial zones in Wuhan include in chronological order:

- Wuhan Economic and Technological Development Zone

Wuhan Economic and Technological Development Zone is a national level industrial zone incorporated in 1993. Its current zone size is about 10–25 square km and it plans to expand to 25–50 square km. Industries encouraged in Wuhan Economic and Technological Development Zone include Auto-mobile Production/Assembly, Biotechnology/Pharmaceuticals, Chemicals Production and Processing, Food/Beverage Processing, Heavy Industry, and Telecommunications Equipment.

- Wuhan Export Processing Zone

Wuhan Export Processing Zone was established in 2000. It is located in Wuhan Economic and Technology Development Zone, planned to cover 2.7 square kilometers (1.0 square mile) of land. The first 0.7-square-kilometer (0.3-square-mile) area has already been created.

- Wuhan Donghu New Technology Development Zone

Wuhan Donghu New Technology Development Zone is a national level high-tech development zone. Optical-electronics, telecommunications, and equipment manufacturing are the core industries of Wuhan East Lake High-Tech Development Zone (ELHTZ) while software outsourcing and electronics are also encouraged. ELHTZ is China's largest production center for optoelectronic products with key players like Yangtze Optical Fiber and Cable, (the largest fiber-optical cable maker in China), and Fiberhome Telecommunications. Wuhan Donghu New Technology Development Zone also represents the development center for China's laser industry with key players such as HGTECH and Chutian Laser being based in the zone.

- Wuhan Optical Valley (Guanggu) Software Park

Wuhan Optical Valley (Guanggu) Software Park is located in Wuhan Donghu New Technology Development Zone. Wuhan Optics Valley Software Park is jointly developed by East Lake High-Tech Development Zone and Dalian Software Park Co., Ltd. The planned area is 0.67 square kilometers (0.26 square miles) with total floor area of 6,000,000 square meters (65,000,000 square feet). The zone is 8.5 km (5.28 mi) away from the 316 National Highway and is 46.7 km (29.02 mi) away from the Wuhan Tianhe Airport.

- Wuhan Biolake

Biolake is an industrial base established in 2008 in the Optics Valley of China. Located in East Lake New Technology Development Zone of Wuhan, Biolake covers 15 km^{2} (5.8 sq mi), and has six parks including Bio-innovation Park, Bio-pharma Park, Bio-agriculture Park, Bio-manufacturing Park, Medical Device Park and Medical Health Park, to accommodate both research activities and living.

== Demographics ==
Historical population
Year	Pop.	±%
1953	1,427,300	—
1982	4,101,000	+187.3%
1990	6,901,911	+68.3%
2000	8,312,700	+20.4%
2010	9,785,388	+17.7%
2020	12,326,500	+26.0%
2022	13,648,900	+10.7%
Population size may be affected by changes on administrative divisions. 2022 yearend est. 1953, 1982, 1990, 2000 2007 2015

Wuhan is the most populous city in Central China and among the most populous in China. In the Seventh Census of China in 2020, Wuhan was home to 12,326,500 inhabitants, a 25.97% increase by 2.5411 million compared to the last census in 2010. 2010-2020 is the fastest growing 10 years in history since the census was established, averaging 2.34% annually, and it was the first time that Wuhan's population reached 10 million.

The encompassing metropolitan area was estimated by the OECD (Organization for Economic Cooperation and Development) to have, as of 2010, a population of 19 million. As of November 2019, urban development status considering both spatial and socioeconomic processes has been examined using Night Time Lighting data and land cover data as proxies; it showed Wuhan's high concentration of socioeconomic activities compared to its urban spatial development.

=== Religion ===
Religion in Wuhan (2017)
1. Chinese religion or not religious (including Taoists (0.9%)) (79.2%)
2. Buddhism (14.7%)
3. Protestantism (2.90%)
4. Islam (1.60%)
5. Catholicism (0.30%)
6. Other (1.60%)

According to a survey published in 2017, 79.2% of the population of Wuhan are either irreligious or practice worship of gods and ancestors; among these 0.9% are Taoists. Among other religious doctrines, 14.7% of the population adheres to Buddhism, 2.9% to Protestantism, 0.3% to Catholicism and 1.6% to Islam, and 1.6% of the population adheres to unspecified other religions.

Religious sites in Wuhan

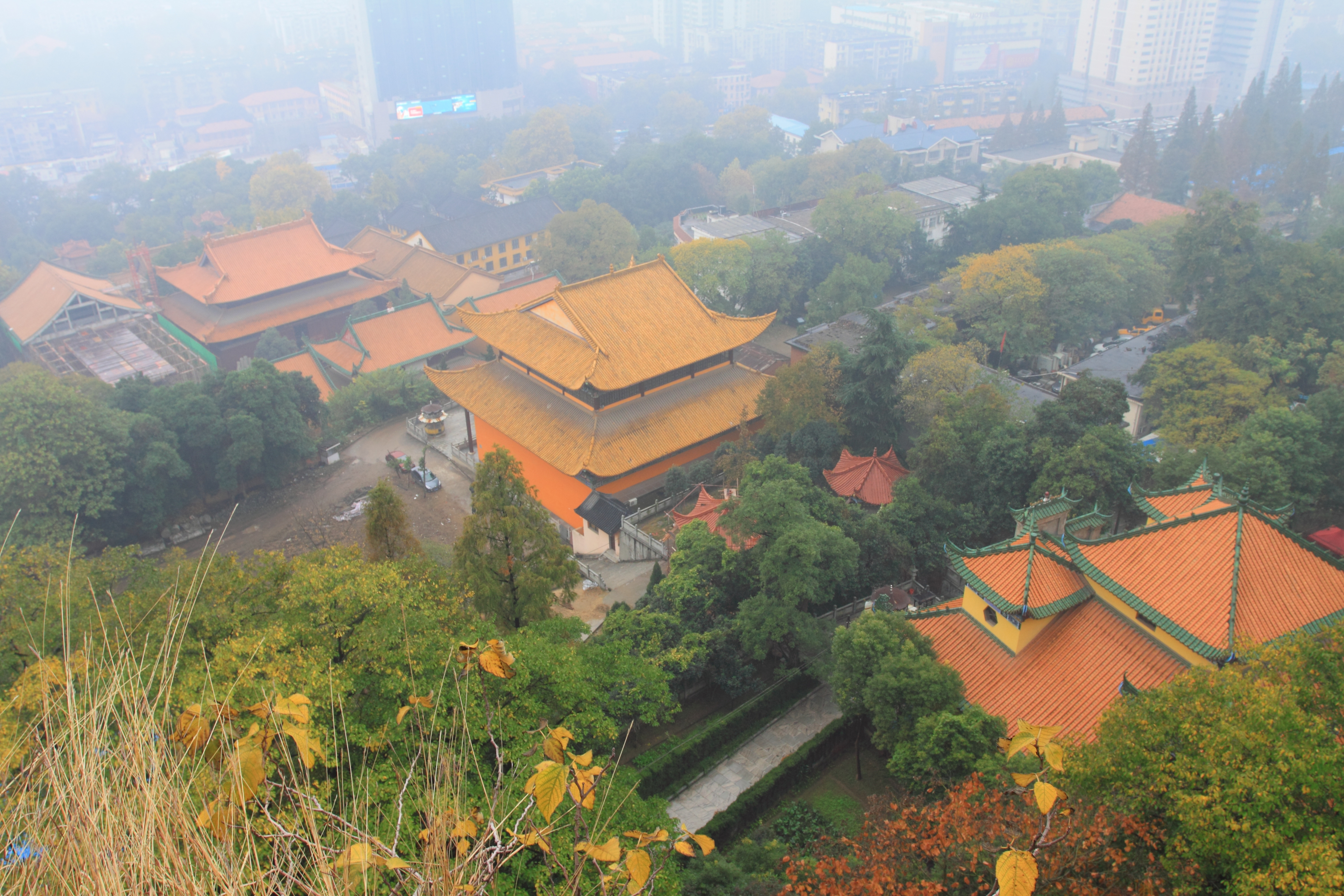
Baotong Buddhist Temple

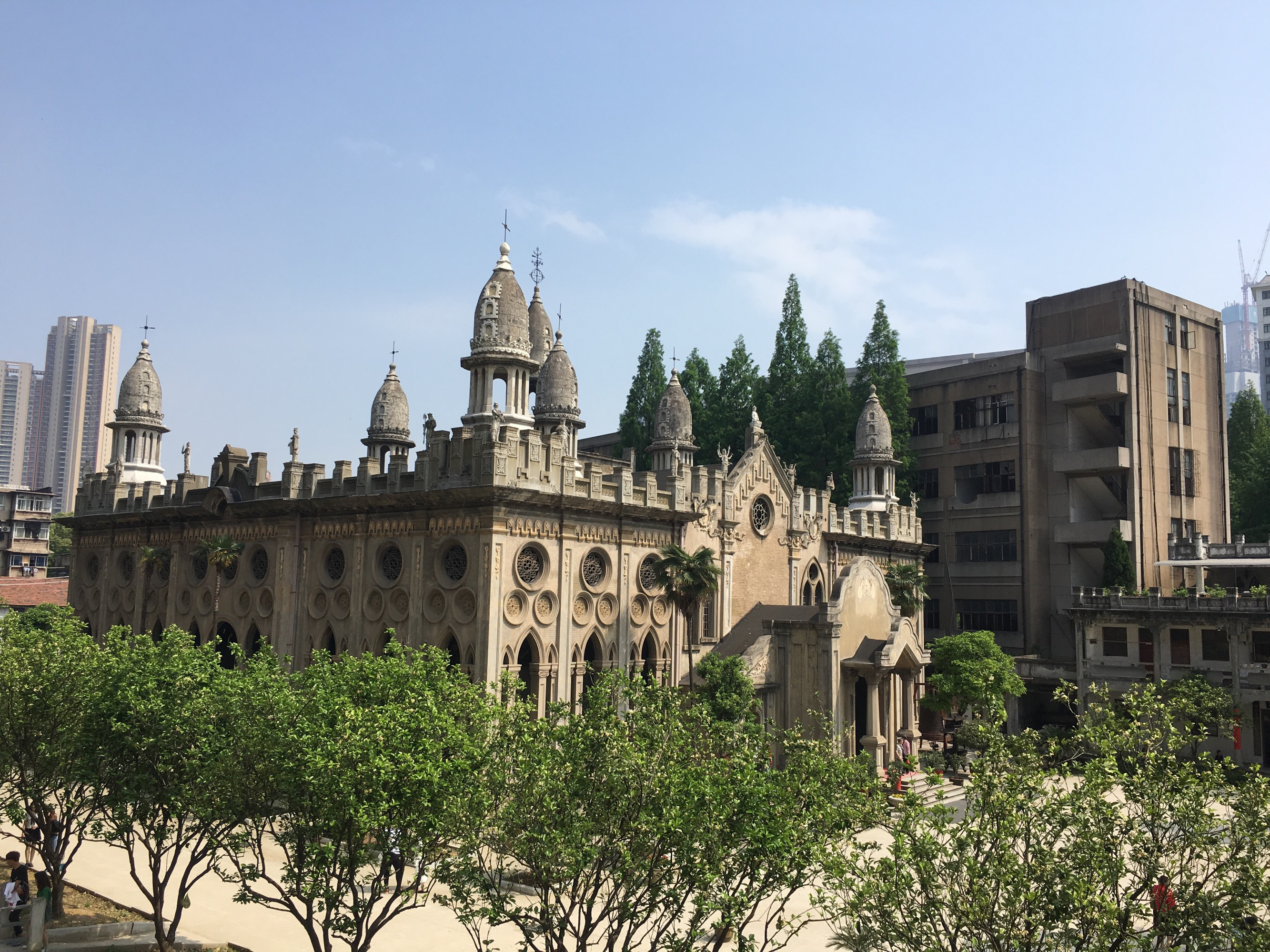
Gude Buddhist Temple

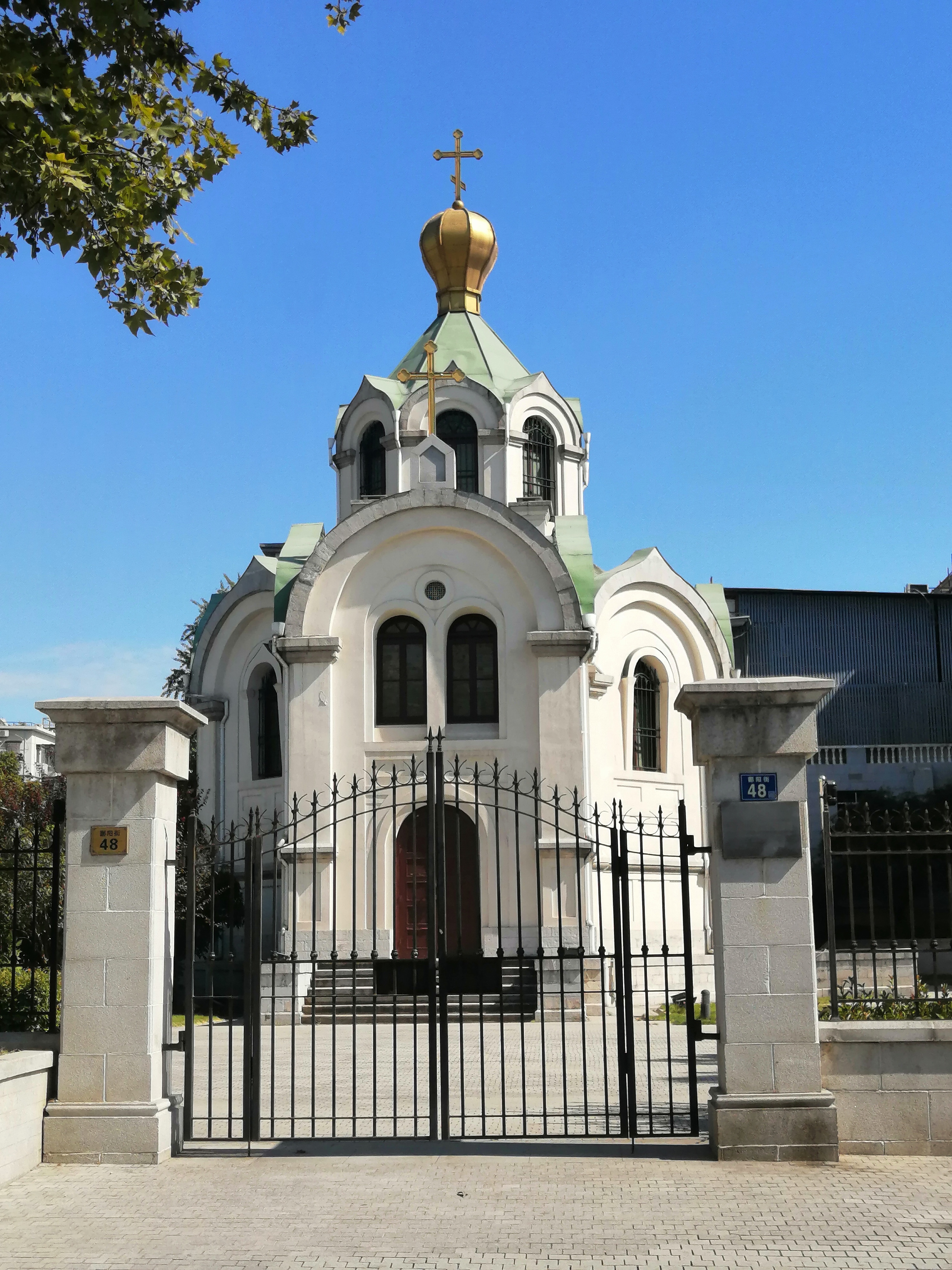
St. Alexander Nevsky Church

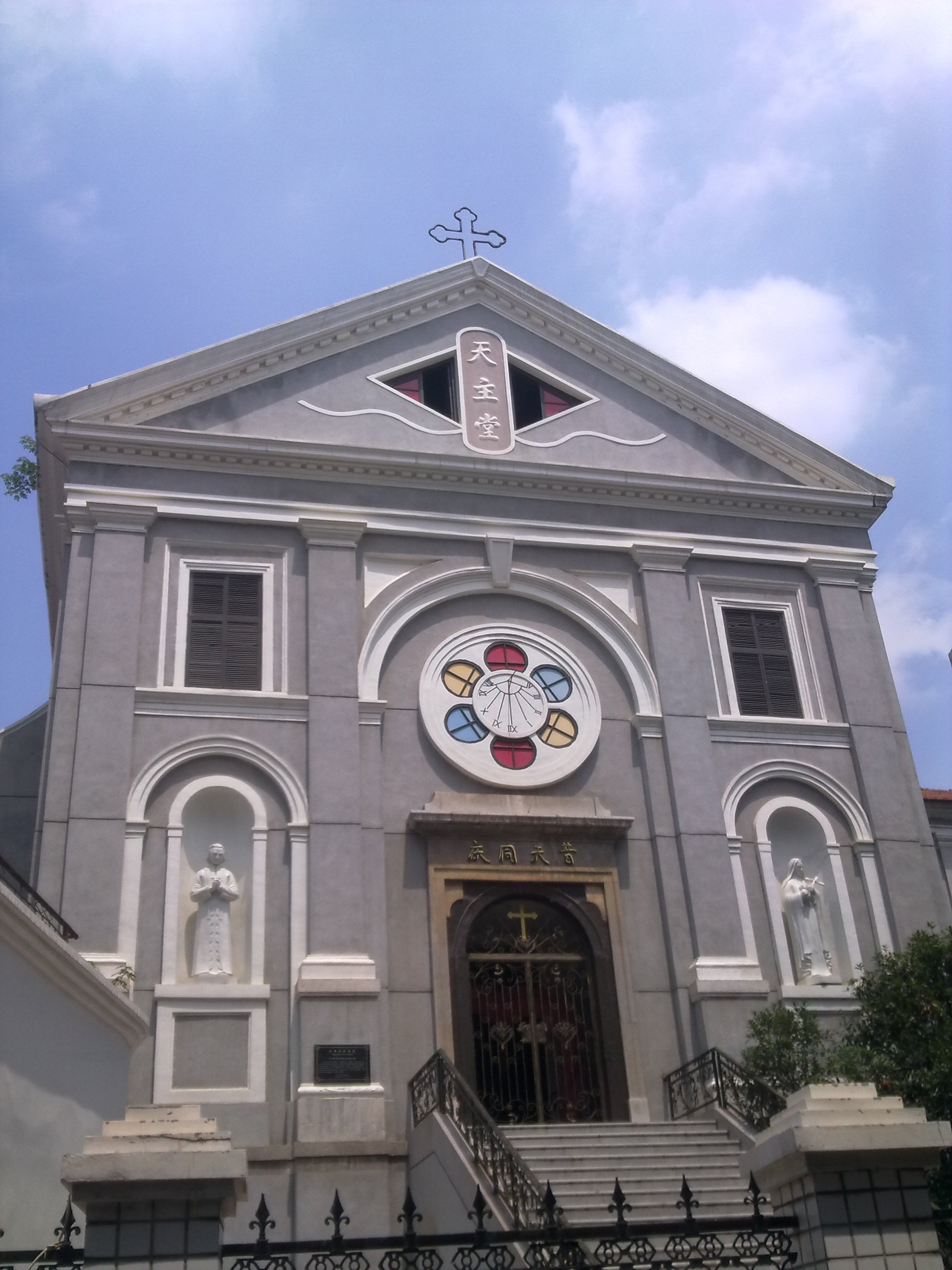
Holy Family Catholic Church

== Transportation ==
=== Railways ===
China Railway Wuhan Group manages the Wuhan Railway Hub. Wuhan Railway Hub is considered one of the four key railway hubs of China. The city of Wuhan is served by three major railway stations: the Hankou railway station in Hankou, the Wuchang railway station in Wuchang, and the Wuhan railway station, located in a newly developed area east of the East Lake (Hongshan District). As the stations are many miles apart, it is important for passengers to be aware of the particular station(s) used by a particular train.

The (original) Hankou Station was the terminus for the Jinghan railway from Beijing, while the Wuchang Station was the terminus for the Yuehan railway to Guangzhou. Since the construction of the First Yangtze Bridge and the linking of the two lines into the Jingguang railway, both Hankou and Wuchang stations have been served by trains going to all directions, which contrasts with the situation in such cities as New York or Moscow, where different stations serve different directions.

With the opening of the Hefei-Wuhan high-speed railway on April 1, 2009, Wuhan became served by high-speed trains with Hefei, Nanjing, and Shanghai; several trains a day now connect the city with Shanghai, getting there in under six hours. As of early 2010, most of these express trains leave from the Hankou railway station.

In 2006, construction began on the new Wuhan railway station with 11 platforms, located on the northeastern outskirts of the city. In December 2009, the station was opened, as China unveiled its second high-speed train with scheduled runs from Guangzhou to Wuhan. Billed as the fastest train in the world, it can reach a speed of 394 km/h (244.82 mph). The travel time between the two cities has been reduced from ten and a half hours to just three. The rail service has been extended north to Beijing.

As of 2011, the new Wuhan railway station is primarily used by the Wuhan-Guangzhou high-speed trains, while most regular trains to other destinations continue to use the Hankou and Wuchang stations.

Construction work is carried out on several lines of the new Wuhan Metropolitan Area intercity railway, which will eventually connect Wuhan's three main rail terminals with several stations throughout the city's outer areas and farther suburbs, as well as with the nearby cities of Xianning, Huangshi, Huanggang, and Xiaogan. The first line of the system, the one to Xianning, opened for passenger operations at the end of 2013. The line to Xiaogen opened on December 1, 2016, and it was extended with the opening of the Wuhan–Shiyan high-speed railway to Shiyan on November 29, 2019.

The main freight railway station and classification yard of the Wuhan metropolitan area is the extensive Wuhan North railway station, with 112 tracks and over 650 switches. It is located in Hengdian Subdistrict of Huangpi District, located 20 km (12 mi) north of the Wuhan Station and 23 km (14 mi) from Hankou Station.

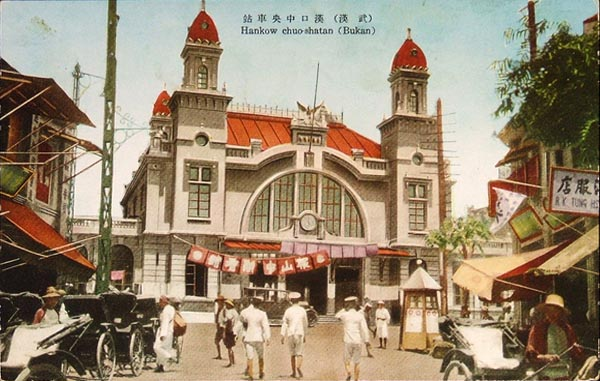
Dazhimen railway station, out of use currently

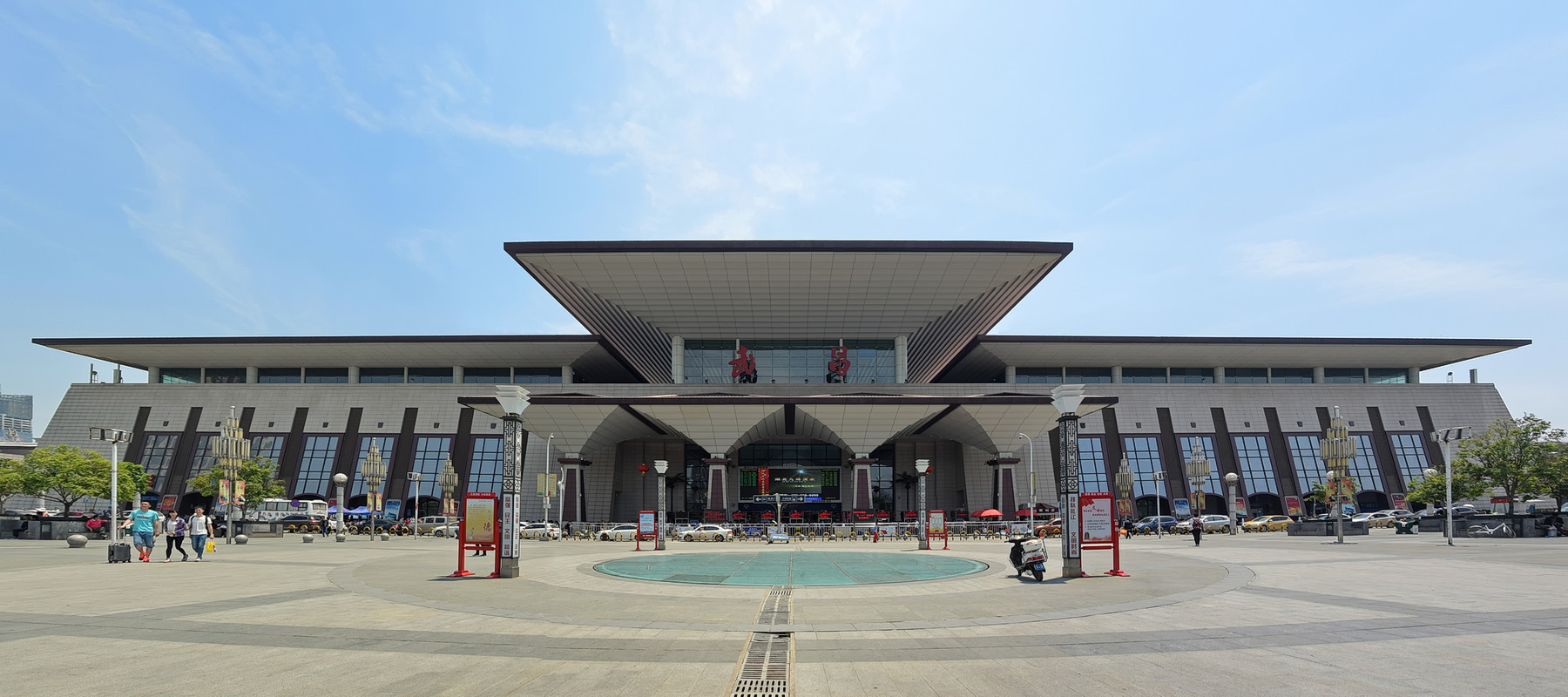
Wuchang railway station

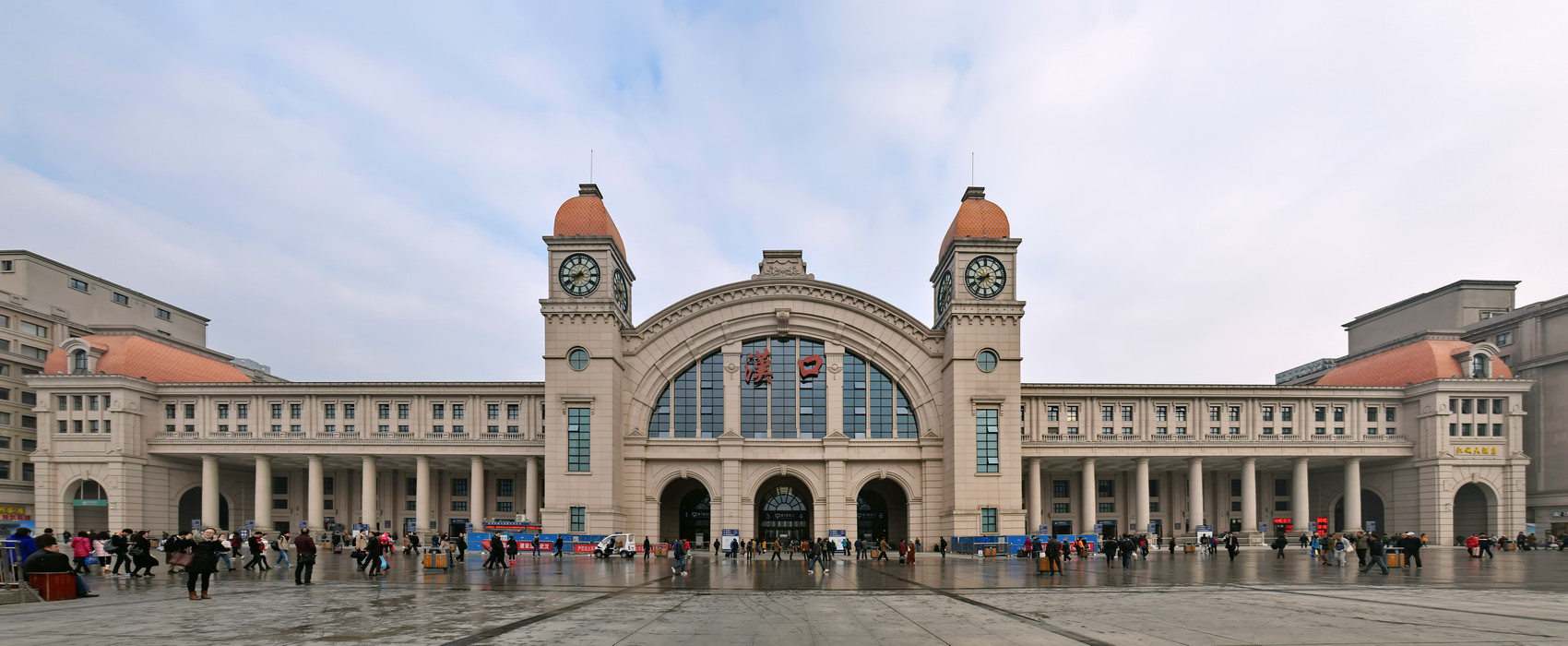
Hankou railway station

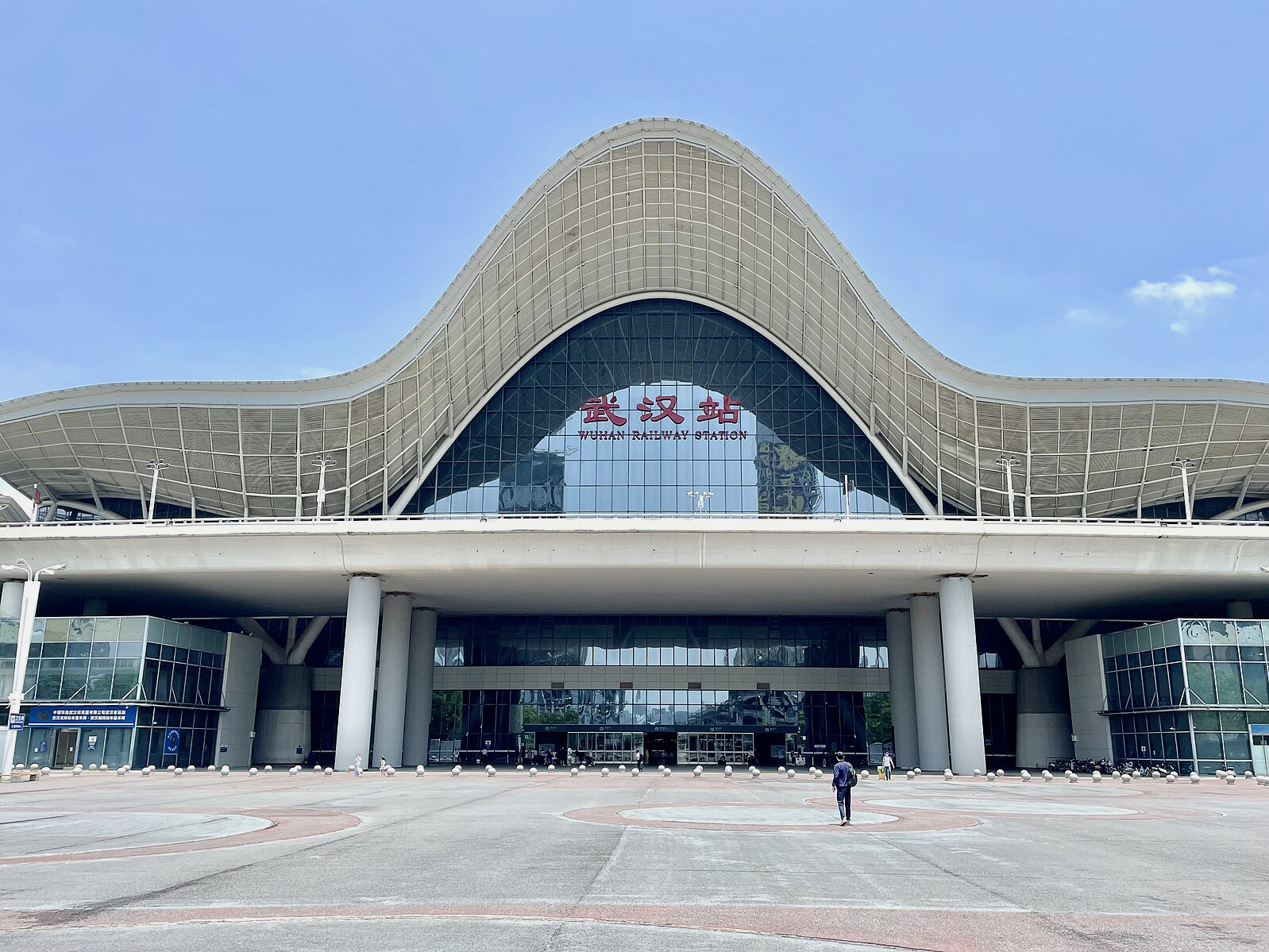
Wuhan railway station

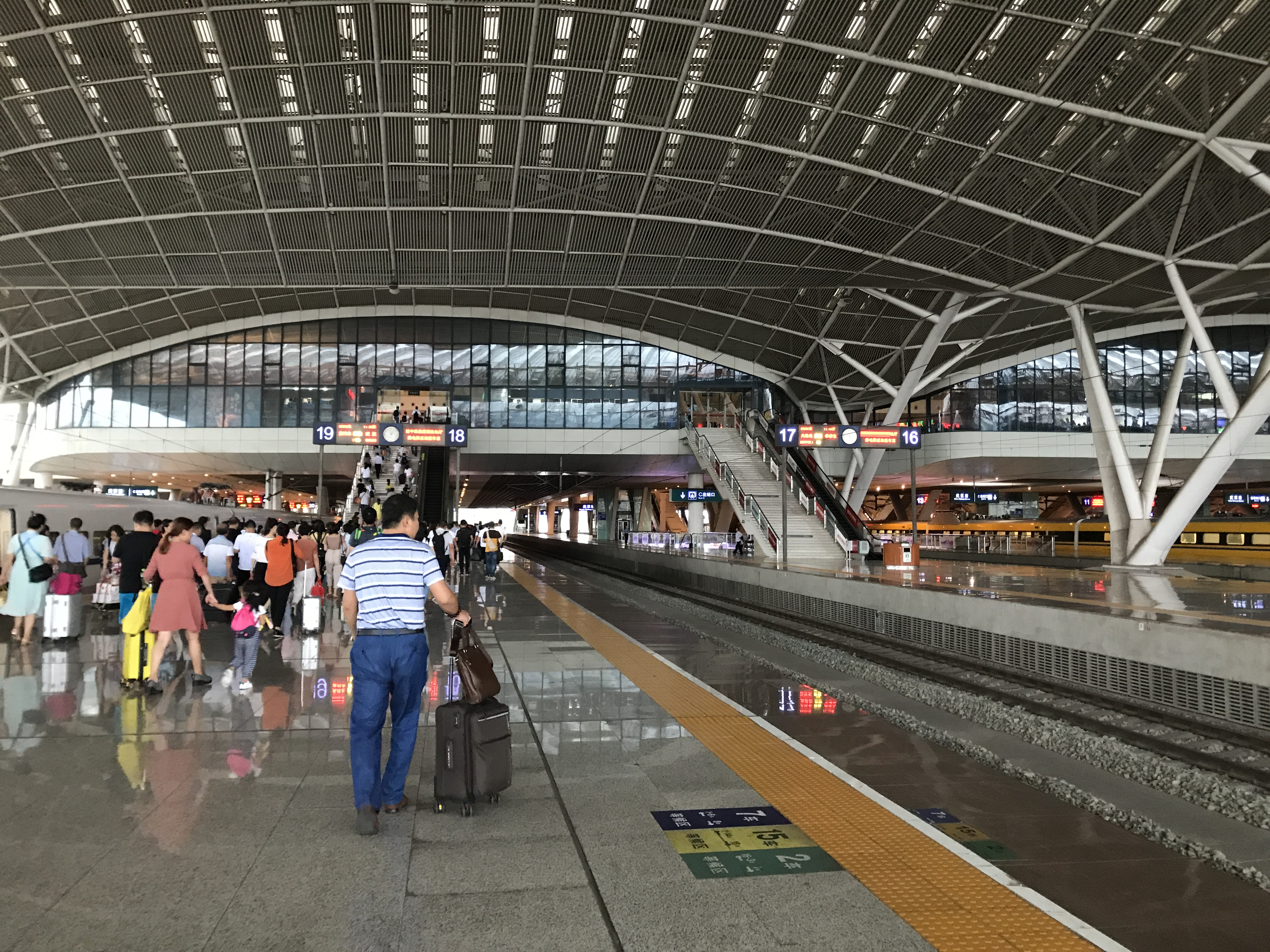
Platform view of Wuhan railway station

Map of Wuhan Metropolitan Area intercity railways

=== Metro ===
Wuhan Metro is a rapid transit system serving the city of Wuhan. Owned and operated by Wuhan Metro Group Co., Ltd., the network now includes 11 lines, 282 stations, and 435 km (270 mi) of route length. Line 1, the first line in the system, opened on July 28, 2004, making Wuhan the seventh city in mainland China with a rapid transit system, after Beijing, Tianjin, Shanghai, Guangzhou, Changchun, and Dalian. Line 2 opened on December 28, 2012, and is the first underground metro line crossing the Yangtze River. Commuting across the Yangtze River and Han River has been the bottleneck of Wuhan traffic. However, the appearance of Wuhan Metro greatly relieved this problem. With 1.22 billion annual passengers in 2019, Wuhan Metro is the sixth-busiest rapid transit system in mainland China. Wuhan Metro is a rapidly developing metro system. There are a number of lines or sections under construction. The government of Wuhan City promised the citizens that at least two lines or sections open every year. Due to the COVID-19 pandemic, the entire network was out of service from January 23 to March 27, 2020.

Wuhan Metro Map

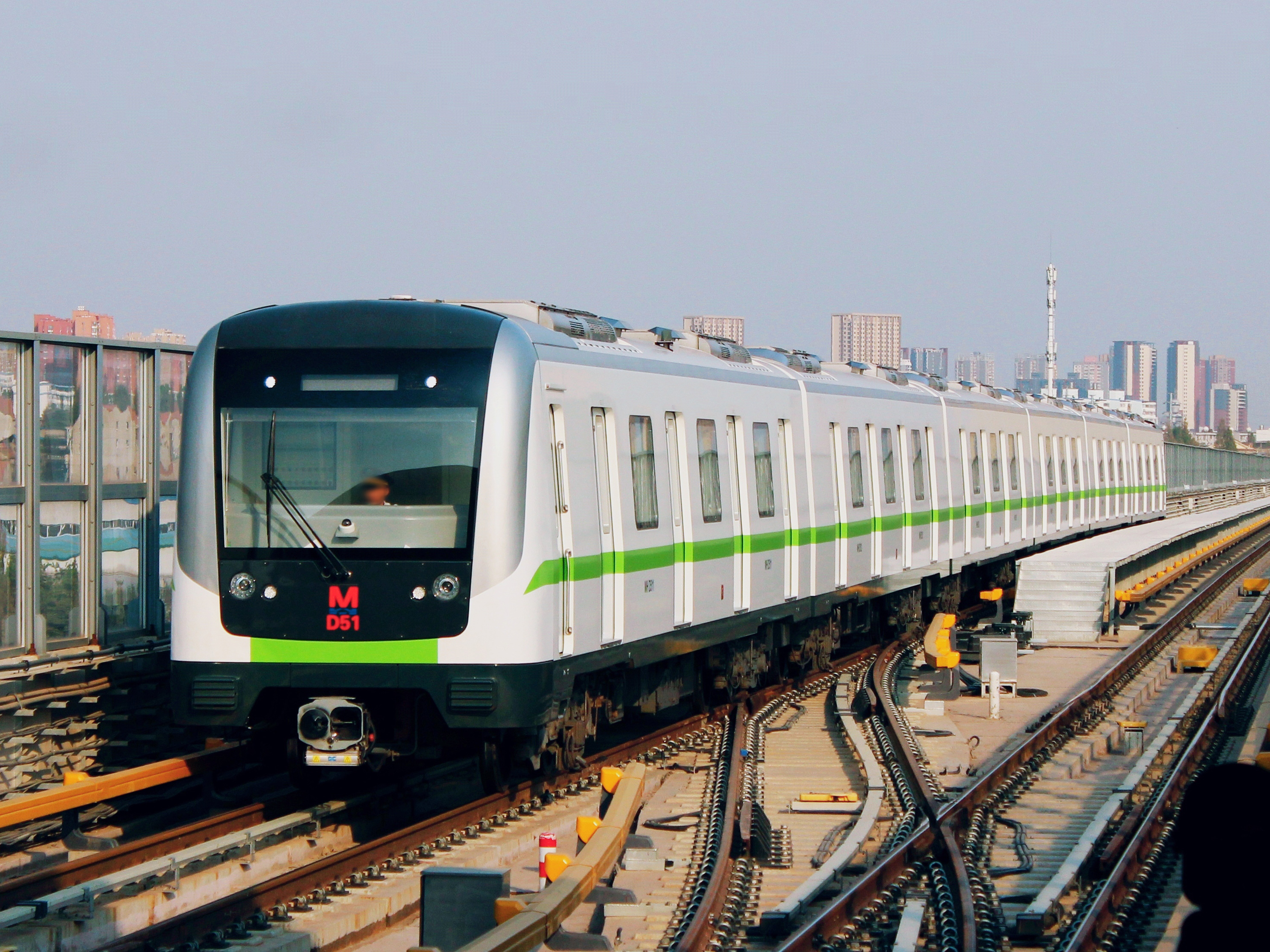
Wuhan Metro Line 4

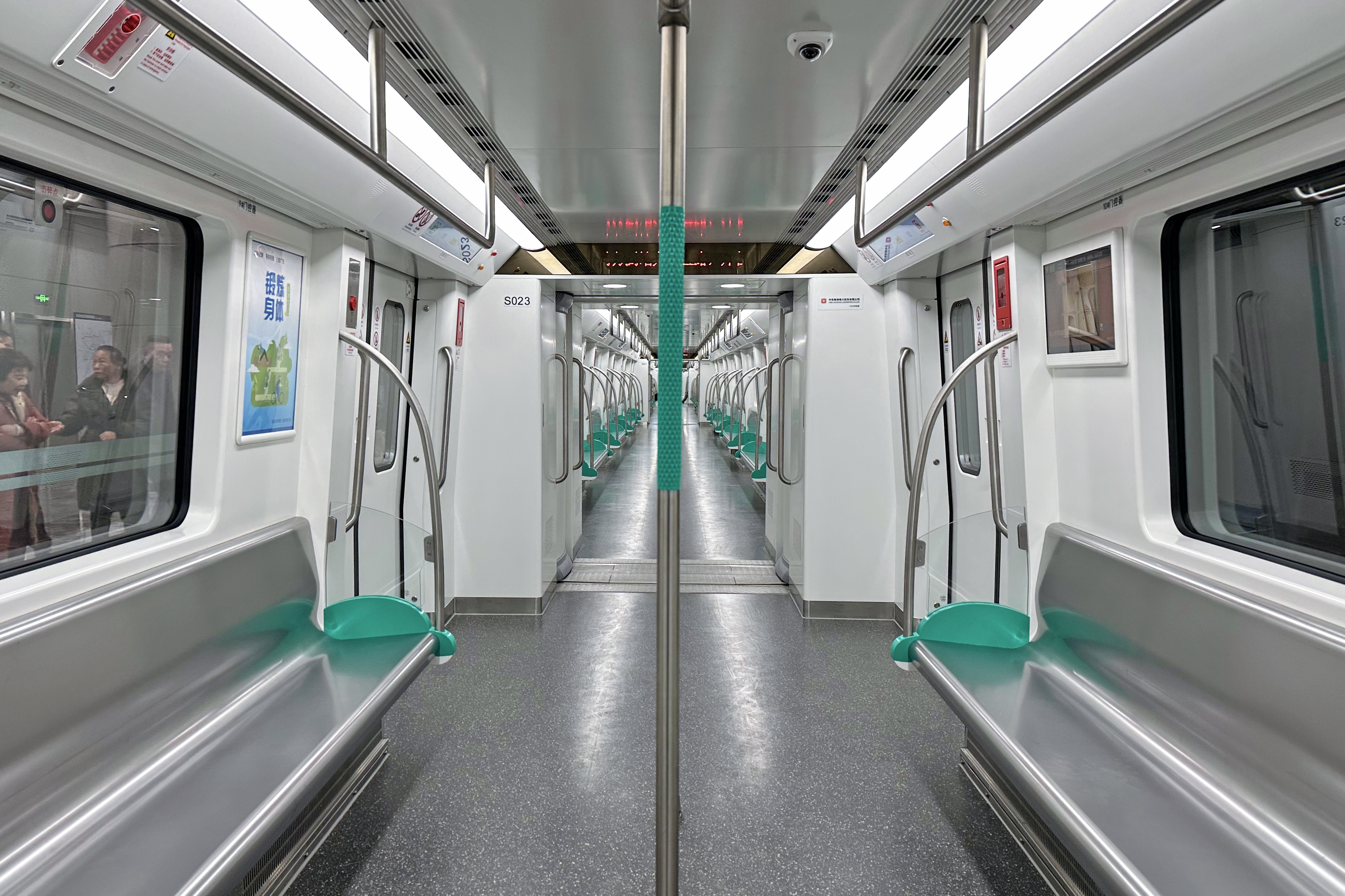
Train interior of Wuhan Metro Line 19

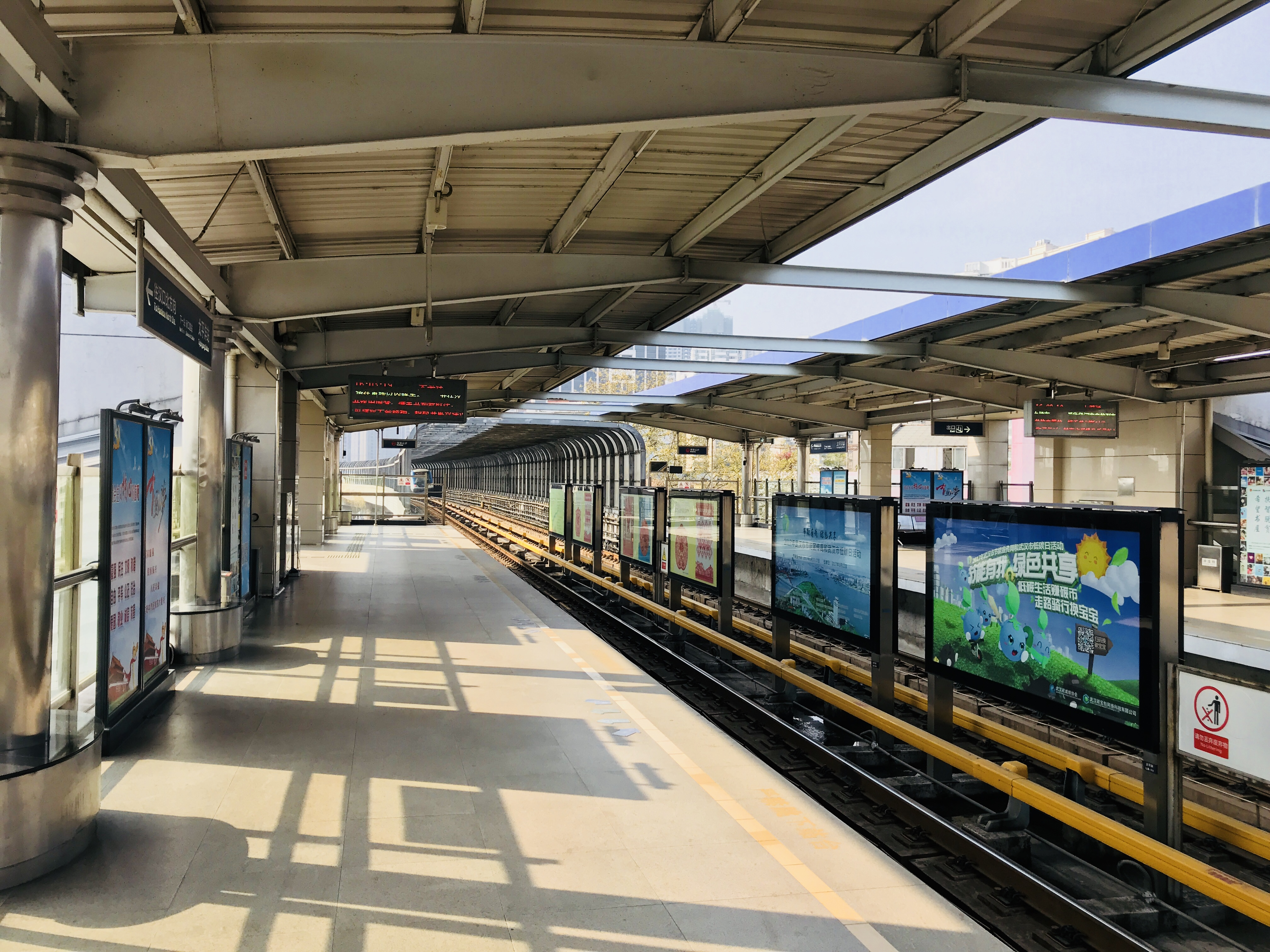
Taipingyang Station

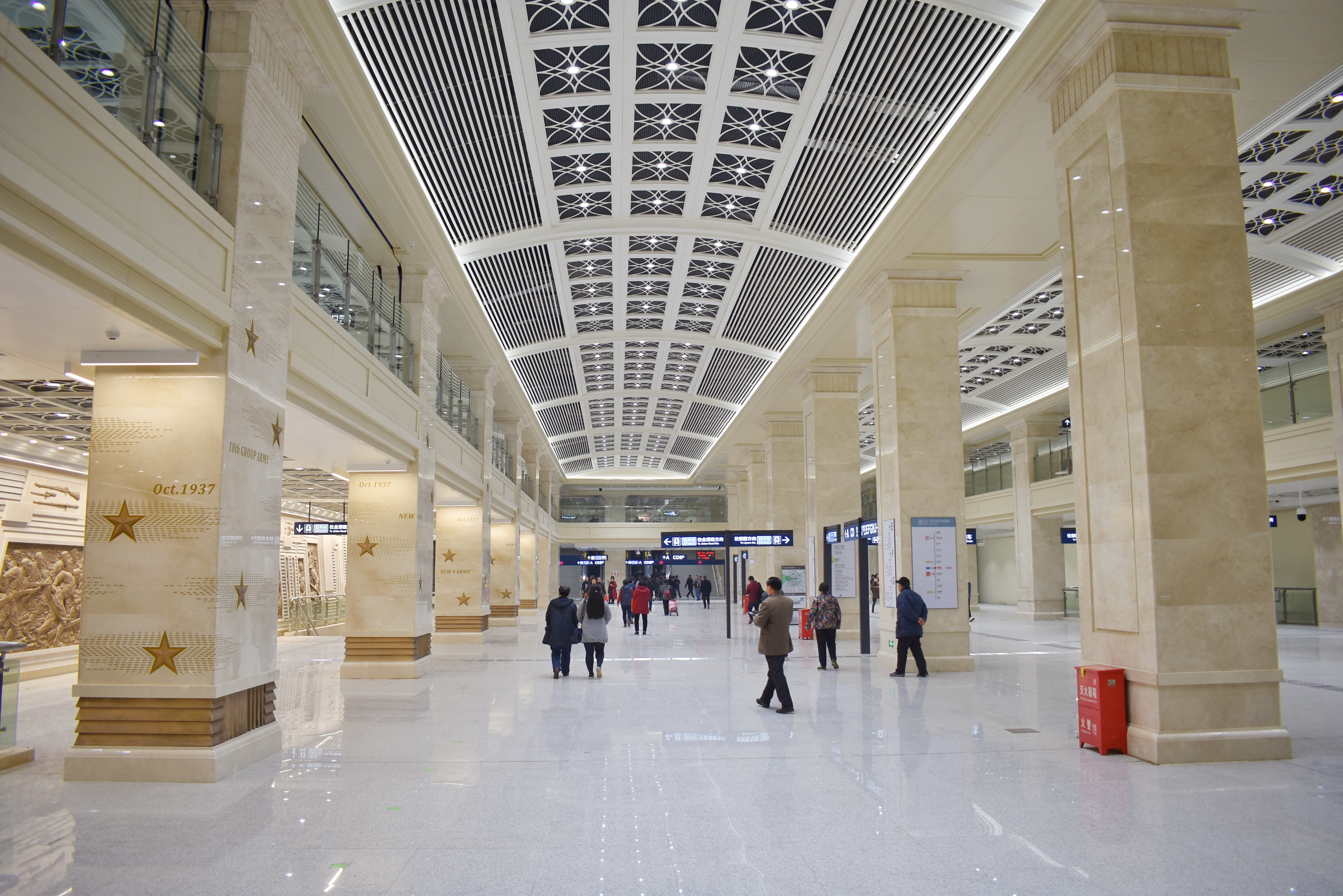
Huangpu Road Station

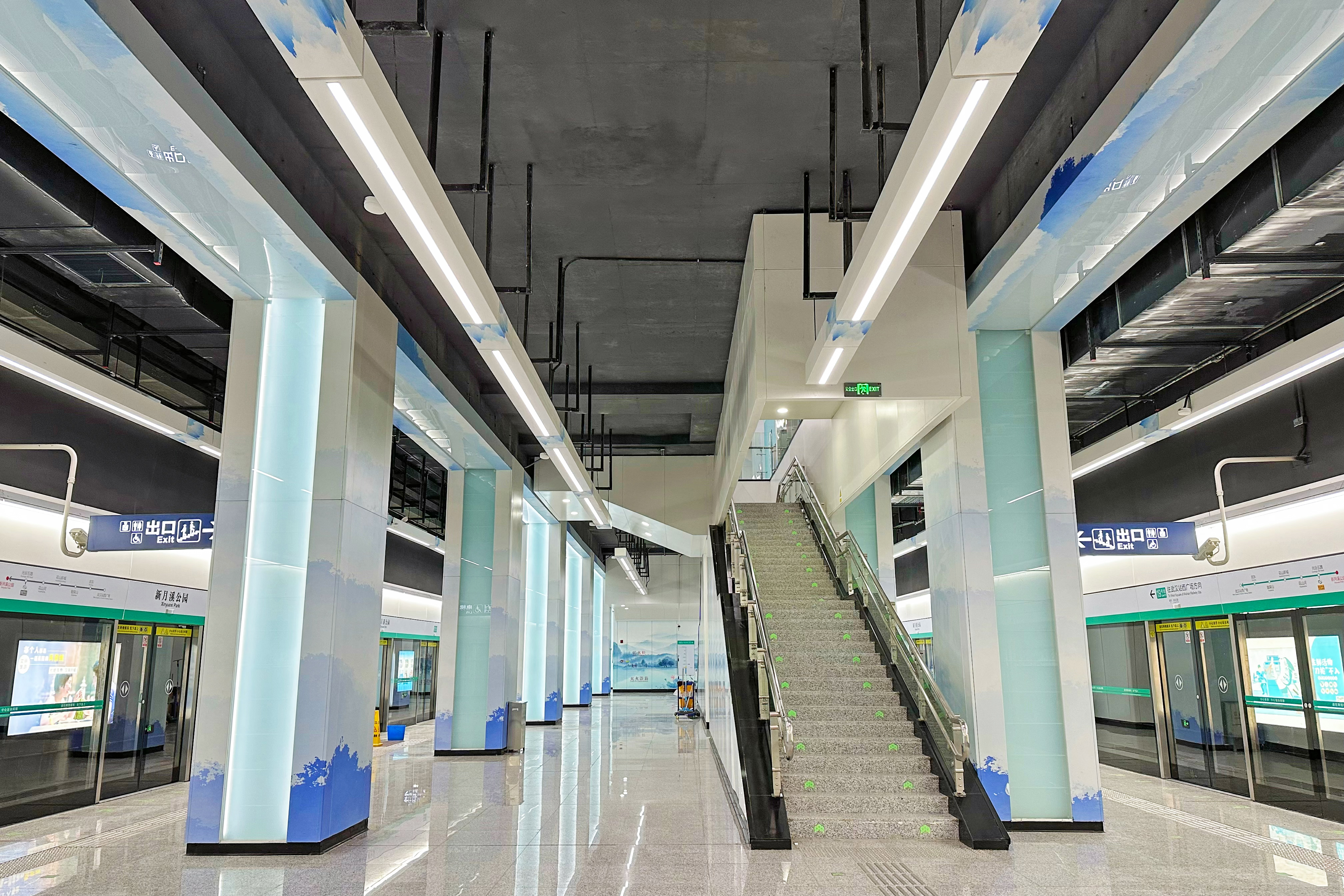
Xinyuexi Park station

=== Trams ===
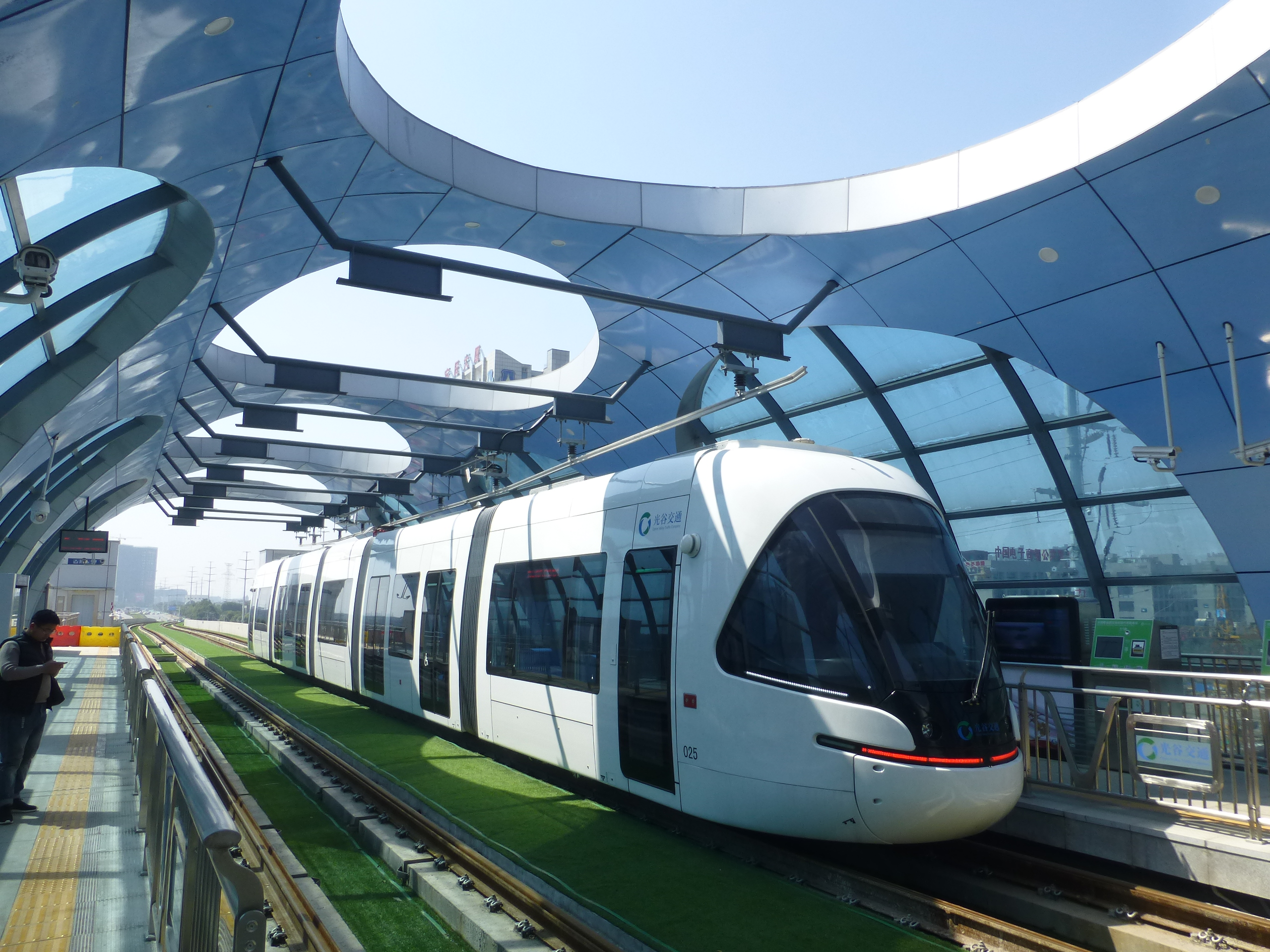
A tram in University Science Park Station

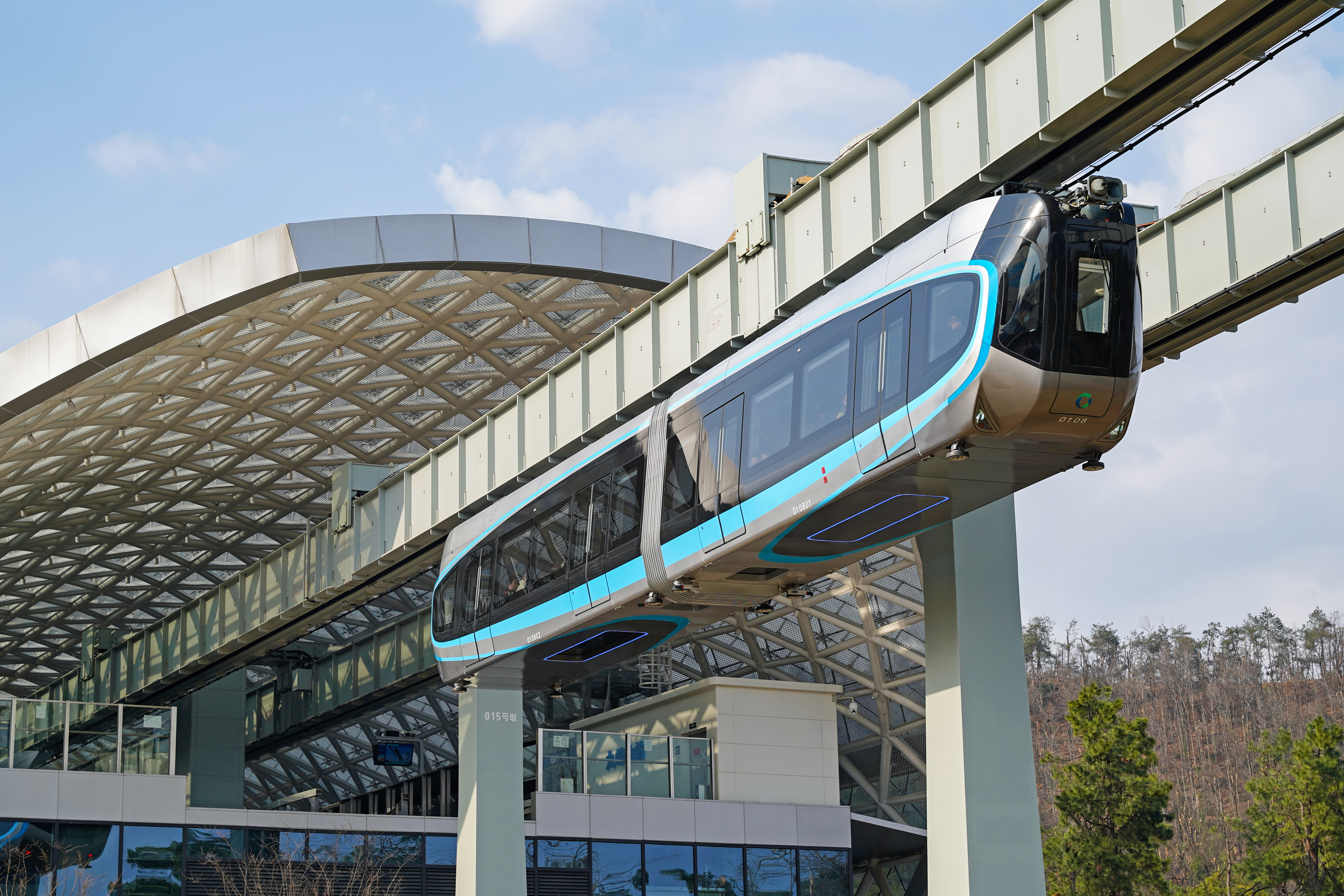
Optics Valley Sky Rail

Trams were brought to the streets of Wuhan on July 28, 2017, with the first line (Auto-city T1 Line) opened that day. The trams under construction or planning in Wuhan are:

- Auto-city trams, with Lines T1, T2, T6, and T8 in the Wuhan Economic Development Area, in the far western reaches on Hanyang. T1 Line is operational as of 2017.
- Optics Valley trams, two lines (T1 and T2) south and east of Guanggu Circle (Guanggu Guangchang) in southeastern Wuchang. The system opened on January 18, 2018.
- The Old Hankou Streetcar, a loop line around Hankou city.

=== Buses ===
Local transport is also provided by buses, including trolleybuses. The trolleybus system has been in operation since 1958. Its first route, which remains in operation today, is route 1.

=== Maritime transport ===
Wuhan is a major hub for maritime transport in central China. The Port of Wuhan provides services for the local population and shipping services.

=== Ferry ===
Located on the banks of the Yangtze River, Wuhan has a long history of ferry services. Modern ferry services were established in 1900 by steam boat. In 1937, a train ferry was established to transport train cars from Hankou to Wuchang. There are numbered stops around Wuhan where people can get on and off the ferry and there is a tourist ferry in the night.

Currently, ferry services are provided by the Wuhan Ferry Company. In 2010, the company bought ten new ships to replace those that had been in service for 29 years.

=== Airports ===
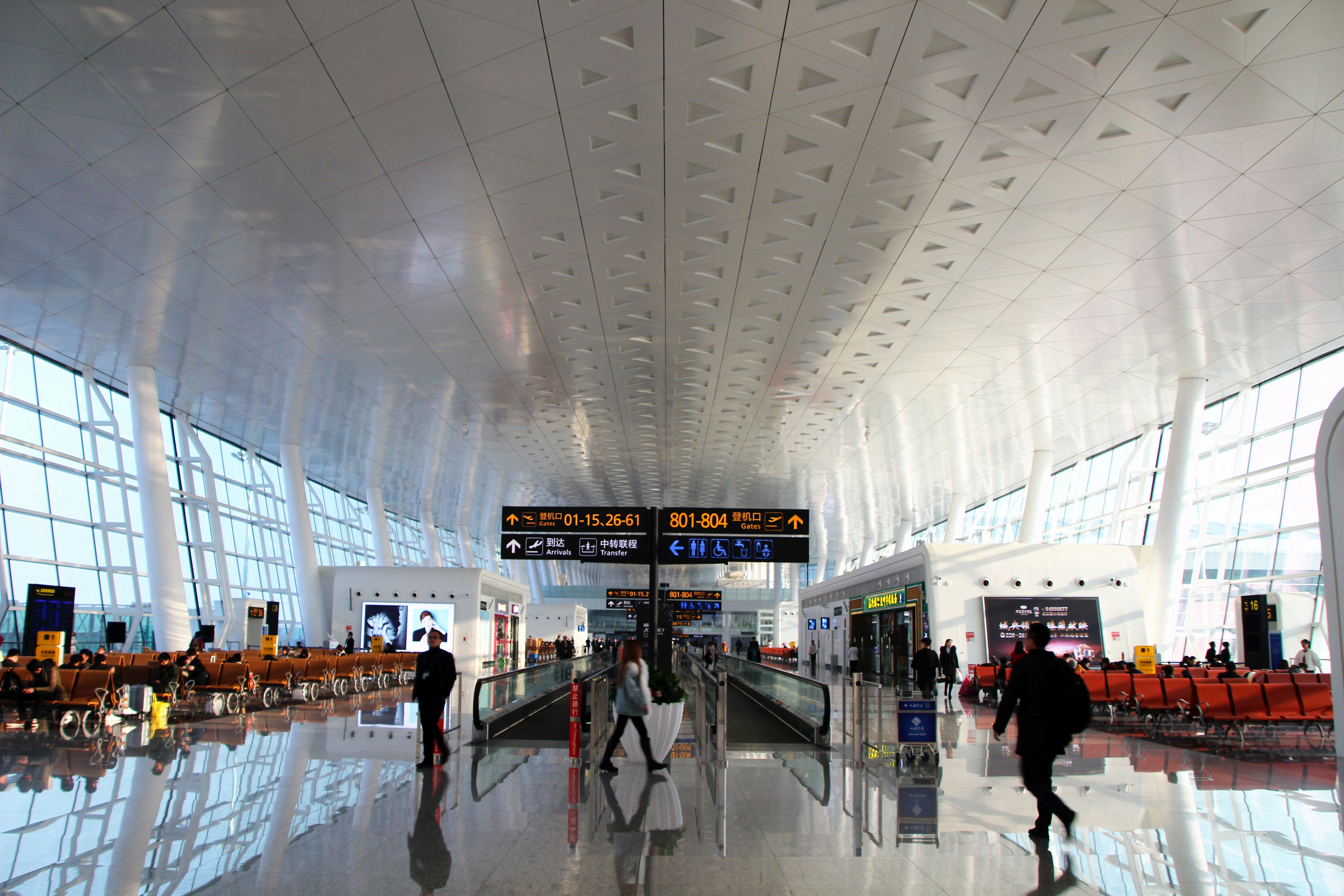
Terminal 3 of Wuhan Tianhe Airport

Wuhan Tianhe International Airport is one of the busiest airports in central China. The airport opened in April 1995 to replace the old Hankou Wangjiadun Airport and Nanhu Airport as the major airport of Wuhan. It is located in Wuhan's suburban Huangpi District, 26 kilometers (16 mi) north of Wuhan city proper. The extension of Line 2 of Wuhan Metro to Tianhe Airport opened on December 28, 2016. It has also been selected as China's fourth international hub airport after Beijing Capital, Shanghai Pudong and Guangzhou Baiyun. A second terminal was completed in March 2008, having been started in February 2005 with an investment of CNY 3.372 billion. International flights to neighboring Asian countries have also been enhanced, including direct flights to Tokyo and Nagoya, Japan. Terminal 3 has been available for service since early 2017.

Wuhan Hannan General Airport is an airport dedicated to general aviation, located in Hannan District of Wuhan. It is the largest airport in China that only handles general aviation. On December 1, 2017, construction began on Wuhan Caidian General Airport, another airport dedicated to general aviation, which is located in Caidian District of Wuhan.

=== Highways and expressways ===
Numerous major highways and expressways pass through Wuhan, including:

- China National Highway 107
- China National Highway 316
- China National Highway 318
- G42 Shanghai–Chengdu Expressway
- G0422 Wuhan–Shenzhen Expressway

=== Bicycle-sharing system ===
As of May 2011, the Wuhan and Hangzhou Public Bicycle bike-share systems in China were the largest in the world, with around 90,000 and 60,000 bicycles respectively. In 2012 the Wuhan and Hangzhou Public Bicycle programs in China are the largest in the world, with around 90,000 and 60,000 bicycles respectively. China has seen a rise in private "dockless" bike shares with fleets that dwarf systems in size outside China. Initially, a number of traditional (third-generation) docked public bike systems operated by local municipal governments opened across China, with the largest ones being in Wuhan and Hangzhou. The first was introduced in Beijing in 2007. However, third-generation bike sharing is not considered successful for the majority cities in China. Bike sharing in Beijing virtually stopped and it also has encountered difficulties in Shanghai and Wuhan.

== Destinations ==
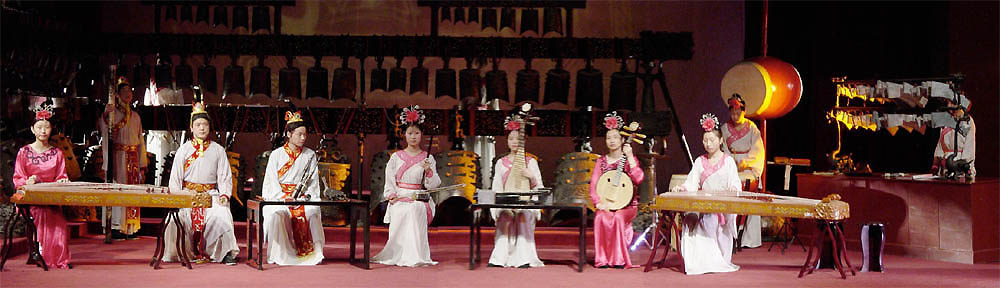
Replica instruments of ancient originals are played at the Hubei Provincial Museum.
A replica set of bronze concert bells is in the background and a set of stone chimes is to the right.

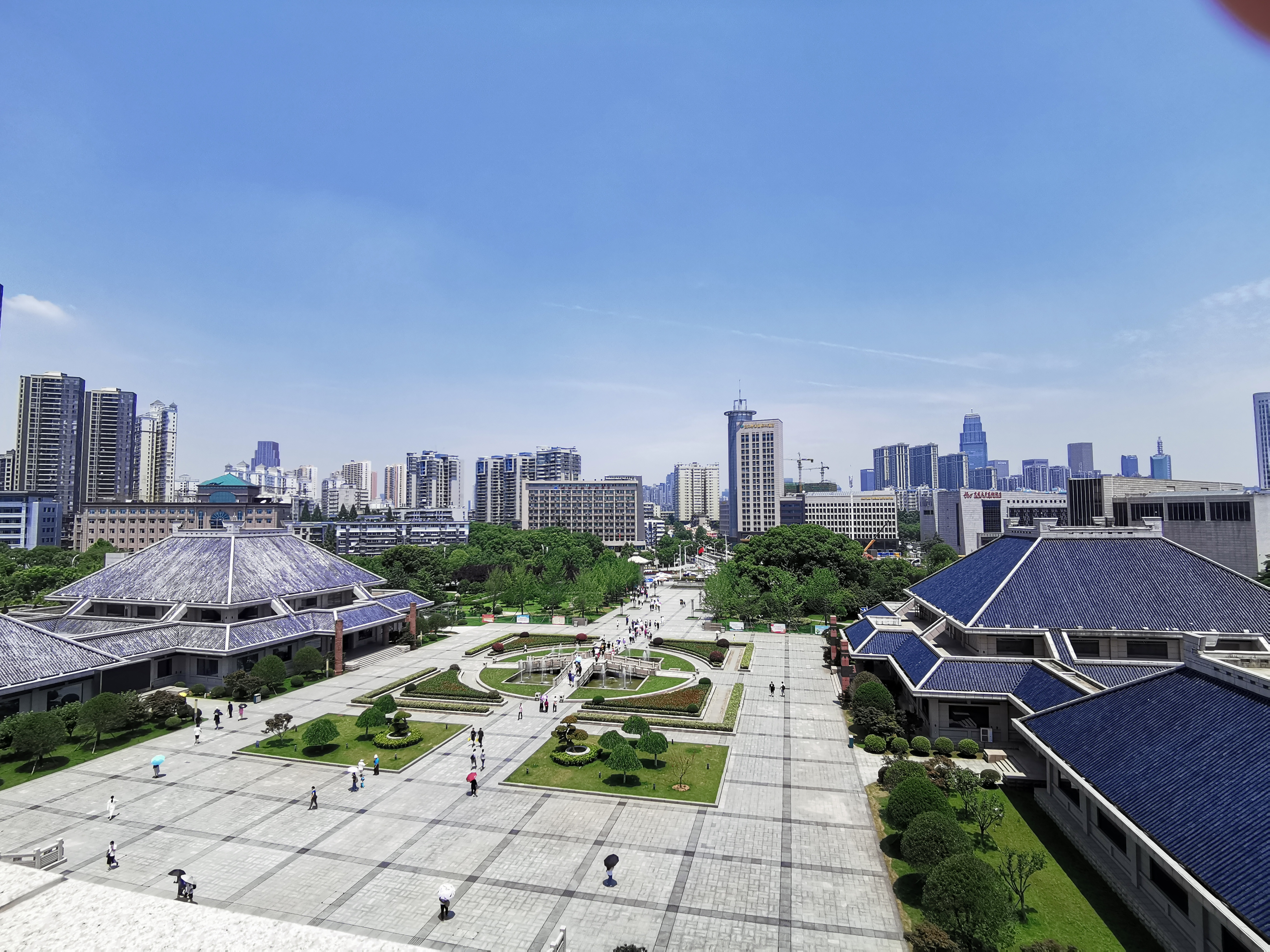
Hubei Provincial Museum

- The Yellow Crane Tower (Huanghelou) is presumed to have been first built in approximately 220 AD. The tower has been destroyed and reconstructed numerous times, and was burned last according to some sources in 1884. The tower underwent complete reconstruction in 1981. The reconstruction utilized modern materials and added an elevator while maintaining the traditional design in the tower's outward appearance.
- Wuchang has the largest and second largest lakes within a city in China, the East Lake and Tangxun Lake, as well as the South Lake. East Lake in Wuhan is six times the size of the West Lake in Hangzhou, Zhejiang province. The total area is more than 80 km^{2} (31 sq mi) of which the lake is covering an area of 33 km^{2} (13 sq mi). In the springtime, the shores of East Lake become a garden of flowers with the Mei blossoms as the king and the Cherry Blossom as the queen among the species at East Lake Cherry Blossom Park. Another famous flower is the lotus. The lake has a long history and especially the Chu Kingdom is well represented around East Lake. Moreover, in the Moshan Botanic Garden there are many types of plum blossoms, as well as lotus flowers.

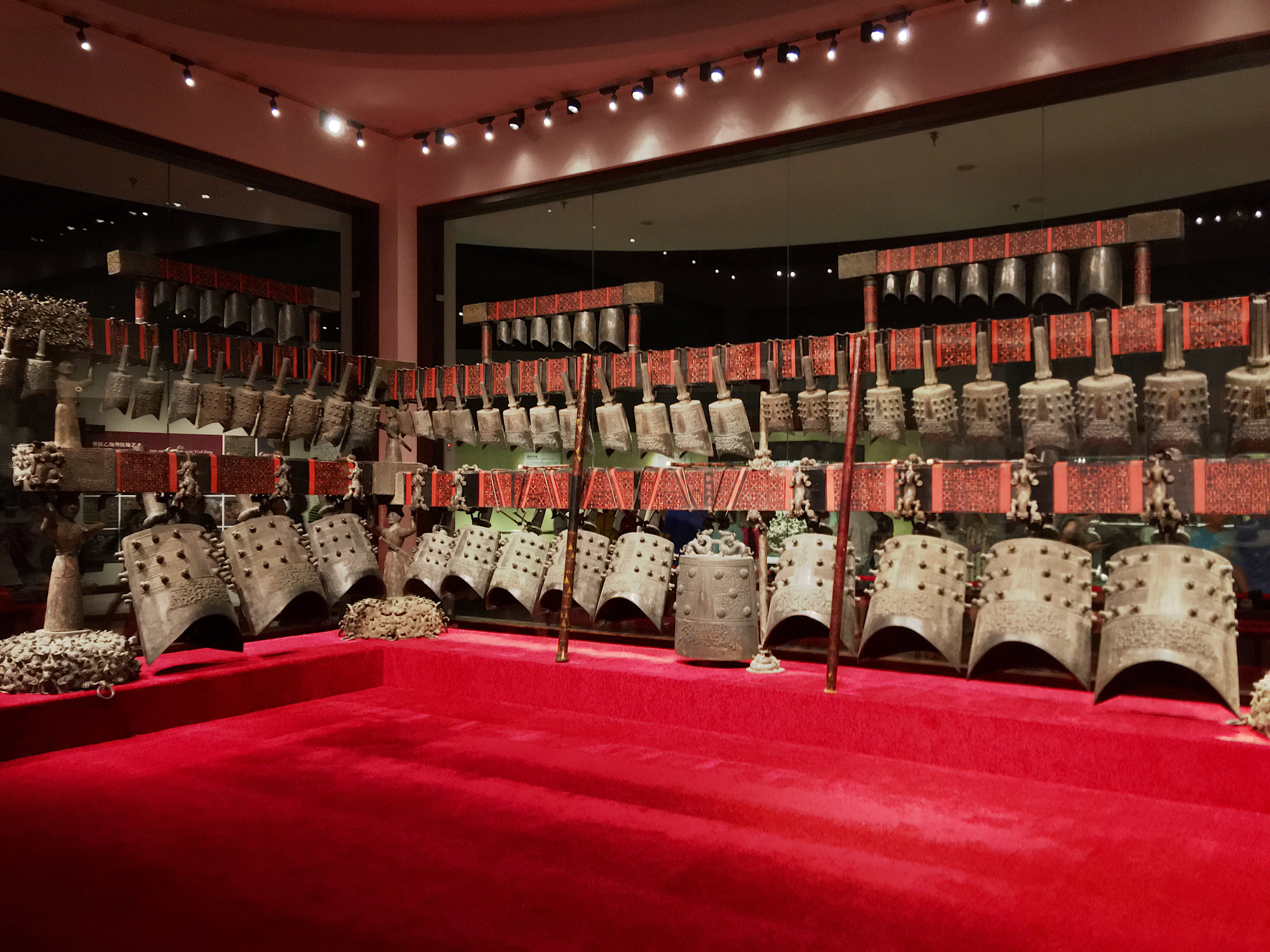
Bianzhong of Marquis Yi of Zeng, made in 433 BC, now on display at the Hubei Provincial Museum in Wuhan

- The Hubei Provincial Museum: With over 200,000 valued artifacts, this is one of the leading museums in China. Especially the artefacts from the tomb of Marquis Yi of Zeng (Zeng Hou Yi), who lived in the 5th century BC, is a world unique treasure. The bell chime of Marquis Yi of Zeng is a bronze instrument performed 2430 years ago in ancient China (Warring States Period), and was discovered in the Tomb of Marquis Yi of Zeng in Suizhou, Hubei in 1978. The whole chime weighs 5 tons, can perfectly play sound which was heard 2430 years ago, and was considered "The Eighth Wonder of the World".
- The Wuhan Museum has a collection of more than 100,000 artifacts, including ceramic, bronze ware, paintings and calligraphy, jade, wood carving, enamel ware, seals and so on. As a modern comprehensive museum, Wuhan Museum has the function in cultural relic collection, academic reach, publicity and education, cultural exchange, and recreation and entertainment.

- Happy Valley Wuhan is a theme park in Hongshan District. Opened on April 29, 2012, it is the fifth installation of the Happy Valley theme park chain.
- The Rock and Bonsai Museum includes a mounted platybelodon skeleton, many unique stones, a quartz crystal the size of an automobile, and an outdoor garden with miniature trees in the penjing ("Chinese Bonsai") style.
- Jiqing Street (吉庆街) holds many roadside restaurants and street performers during the evening and is the site of a Live Show with stories of events on this street by contemporary writer Chi Li.
- The Lute Platform in Hanyang was where the legendary musician Yu Boya is said to have played. This is the birthplace of the renowned legend of seeking a soul mate through "high mountains and flowing water". According to the story behind the Chinese word '知音' (zhīyīn; 'understanding music'), Yu Boya played for the last time over the grave of his friend Zhong Ziqi, then smashed his lute because the only person able to appreciate his music was dead.
- Mao's Villa (毛澤東別墅), Mao Zedong's villa between 1960 and 1974; includes garden, living quarters, conference room, bomb shelter and swimming pool.
- Some luxury riverboat tours begin here after a flight from Beijing or Shanghai, with several days of flatland cruising and then climbing through the Three Gorges with passage upstream past the Gezhouba and Three Gorges dams to the city of Chongqing. With the completion of the dam, a number of cruises now start from the upstream side and continue west, with tourists traveling by motorcoach from Wuhan.
- Wuying Pagoda or the "Shadowless Pagoda" is the oldest standing architectural feature in Wuhan, dating from the closing days of the Southern Song dynasty.
- Chu River and Han Street, a shopping district located in Wuchang with many tourist attractions, including Han Show theater, Madame Tussauds wax museum, and Movie Culture Park, etc. This project was initiated as a water connecting channel between East Lake and Shahu Lake.
- Wuhan Zoo in Hanyang.
- The Huanan Seafood Wholesale Market is a live animal and seafood market in the Jianghan District. The market is located in the newer part of the city near shops and apartment blocks and is close to Hankou railway station. The market has been identified as a possible point of origin of the COVID-19 pandemic.
- The Wuhan Institute of Virology (WIV) is located in the Wuchan District. It is, "the key laboratory of the Chinese Academy of Sciences for newly emerging and fulminating infectious disease pathogen and biosecurity." The institute has been an active premier research center for the study of coronaviruses.
- The Chongzhen Church is the oldest Christian church in Wuhan and Hubei Province. Built in 1864 in the Wuchang district, the single-story Gothic structure was included in the "Second Batch of Outstanding Historical Buildings in Wuhan City" in 2005.
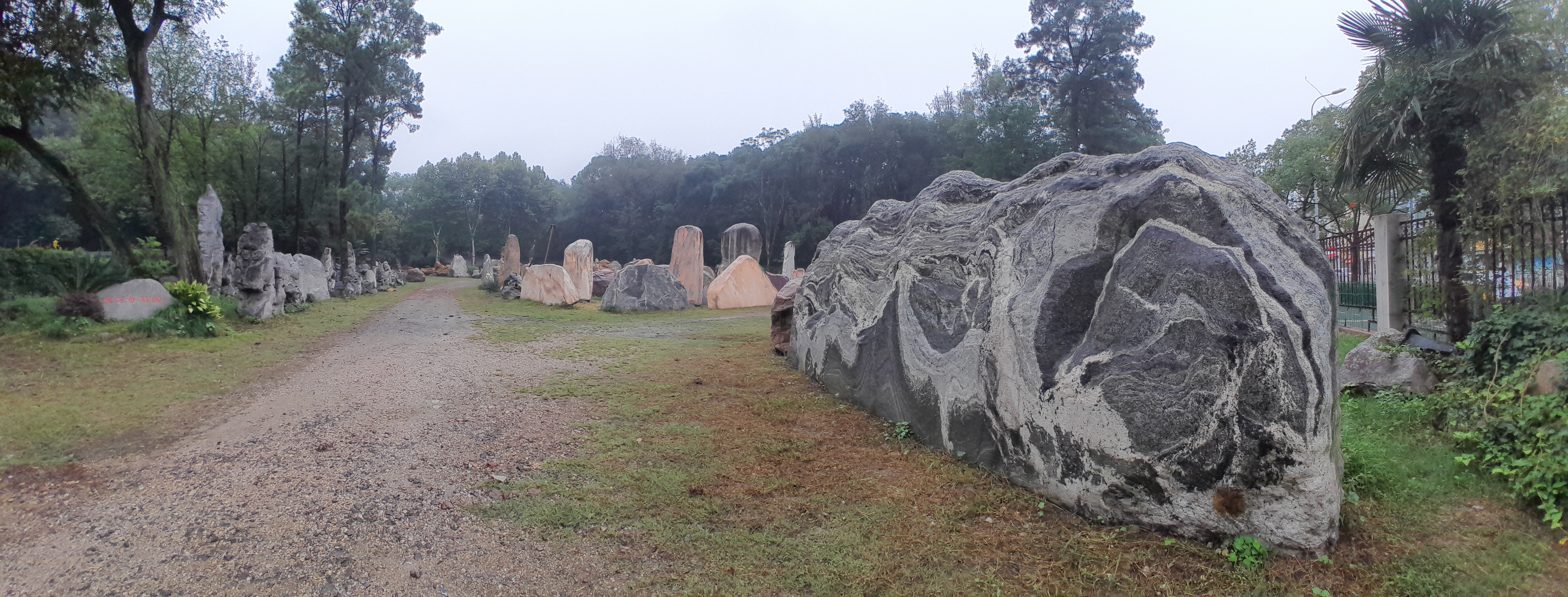
View from within the Wuhan Stones Park (武汉奇石园) along Lumo Road.

== Education ==
=== Schools and universities ===
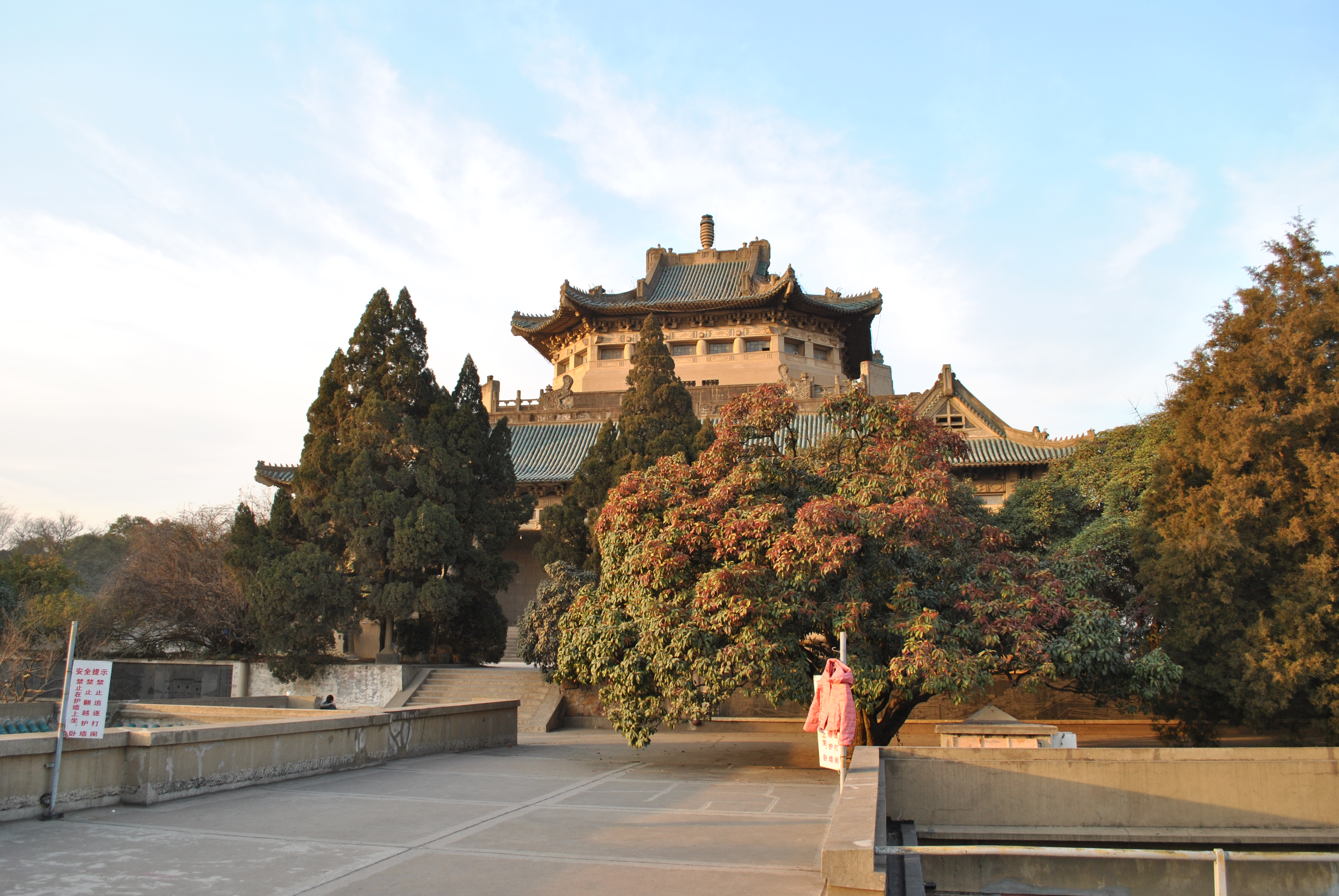
The old library of Wuhan University

As of 2023, there are 82 higher educational institutions in Wuhan, making it a leading educational hub in the Central China region. Wuhan is also an important hub for international students, and it was ranked the best city in the Central China region, 4th in China, and 86th globally by the QS Best Student Cities Rankings in 2026. According to the U.S. News & World Report Best Global University Ranking for 2026–27, Wuhan had 16 universities included in the rankings, with two universities in the top 100 and six in the top 500. It is the only city in the Central China region with two universities ranked in the top 100 globally, and it is one of only five cities in Asia, following Hong Kong, Beijing, Shanghai, and Singapore, to achieve this distinction.

Prominent institutions include Huazhong University of Science and Technology and Wuhan University. Three state-level development zones and many enterprise incubators are also significant in Wuhan's education and business development. Wuhan ranks third in China in overall strength of science and technology.

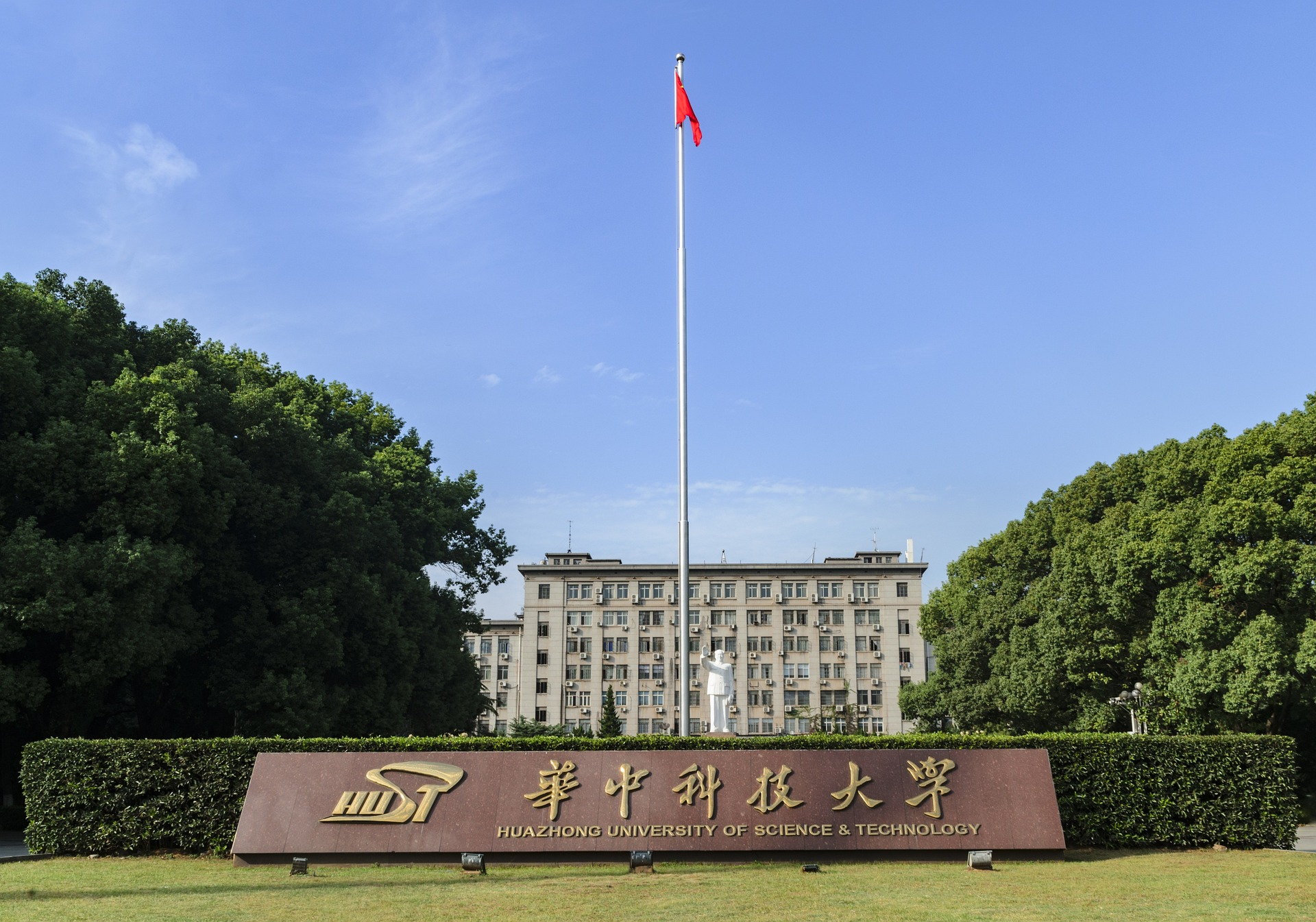
Huazhong University of Science and Technology

Huazhong University of Science and Technology (HUST), located in the Optics Valley of China near East Lake, is a Project 985 and Class A Double First Class University. HUST manages Wuhan National Laboratories for Opto-electronics (WNLO), which is one of the five national laboratories in China. HUST is also one of four Chinese universities eligible to run the national laboratory and the national major science and technology infrastructure. Founded in 1953 as Huazhong Institute of Technology, it combined with three other universities (including former Tongji Medical University founded in 1907) in 2000 to form the new HUST, and has 42 schools and departments covering 12 comprehensive disciplines. HUST has 12 Fellows of Chinese Academy of Sciences and 17 Fellows of Chinese Academy of Engineering. As of 2025, the U.S. News' 2025 U.S. News & World Report ranked HUST #91 in the world, while the Academic Ranking of World Universities ranked the university #73 in the world, 13th in Asia and 8th in China. More than 2,000 international students from 120 countries pursue degrees at HUST.

Wuhan University is another Project 985 and Class A Double First Class University, which was ranked #77 in the world, #15 in Asia and 8th in China by the 2026 Academic Ranking of World Universities and 85th in the world and 18th in Asia by the U.S. News & World Report, while it was ranked the 134th by the 2025 Times Higher Education; established in 1893, the old Wuhan University absorbed three other schools (two of them being its spin-offs since the 1950s) in 2000 to become a university with 36 schools in 6 faculties. Since the 1950s it has received international students from more than 109 countries.

As of the end of 2013, in Wuhan there were 1,024 kindergartens with 224,300 children, 590 primary schools with 424,000 students, 369 general high schools with 314,000 students, 105 secondary vocational and technical schools with 98,600 students, and 80 colleges and universities with 966,400 undergraduates and junior college students and 107,400 postgraduate students. There are several international schools in Wuhan.

=== Scientific research ===
Wuhan is a major city in the world by scientific research outputs and it ranks 8th globally and 5th in the Asia-Pacific & China (after Beijing, Shanghai, Nanjing and Guangzhou). When compared to other countries in the region, Wuhan ranked higher than Australia, securing fifth place in Asia and Oceania after China, Japan, South Korea, and India, according to the Nature Index for 2025. For instance, Wuhan's share of the 2024 Nature Index is 1,526.22, while Australia's share is 1,472.49.

Wuhan contains three national development zones and four scientific and technological development parks, as well as numerous enterprise incubators, over 350 research institutes, 1470 high-tech enterprises, and over 400,000 experts and technicians.

Founded in 1958, the Wuhan Branch of Chinese Academy of Sciences is one of the twelve national branches of CAS. It is composed of 9 independent organizations, including the headquarters at Xiaohongshan, Wuchang. It has had a staff of 3,900, among which 8 are CAS fellows, and one is a Chinese Academy of Engineering fellow. As of 2013, the achievements gained by WHB had won 23 National Awards and 778 Provincial Awards. Wuhan Research Institute of Post and Telecommunications (now known as FiberHome Technologies Group) is the national center for optical communication research in China, and is where the first optical fiber in the country was produced. The Wuhan Institute of Virology is also operated by the CAS.

Wuhan University of Technology is another major national university with three main campuses located in the Wuchang District. Founded in the year 2000, it was merged from three major universities, Wuhan University of Technology (established in 1948), Wuhan Transportation University (established in 1946) and Wuhan Automotive Polytechnic University (established in 1958). Wuhan University of Technology, together with China University of Geosciences (Wuhan), Huazhong Agricultural University, Zhongnan University of Economics and Law and Central China Normal University (or Huazhong Normal University), are the leading Chinese universities accredited by the Ministry of Education under the "State Project 211" for Chinese higher education institutions. Other major research universities have its seat in the city, including Wuhan University of Science and Technology, Hubei University, Hubei University of Technology, and South Central University for Nationalities.

Wuhan is a major site for water planning and research in central China.

== Media ==
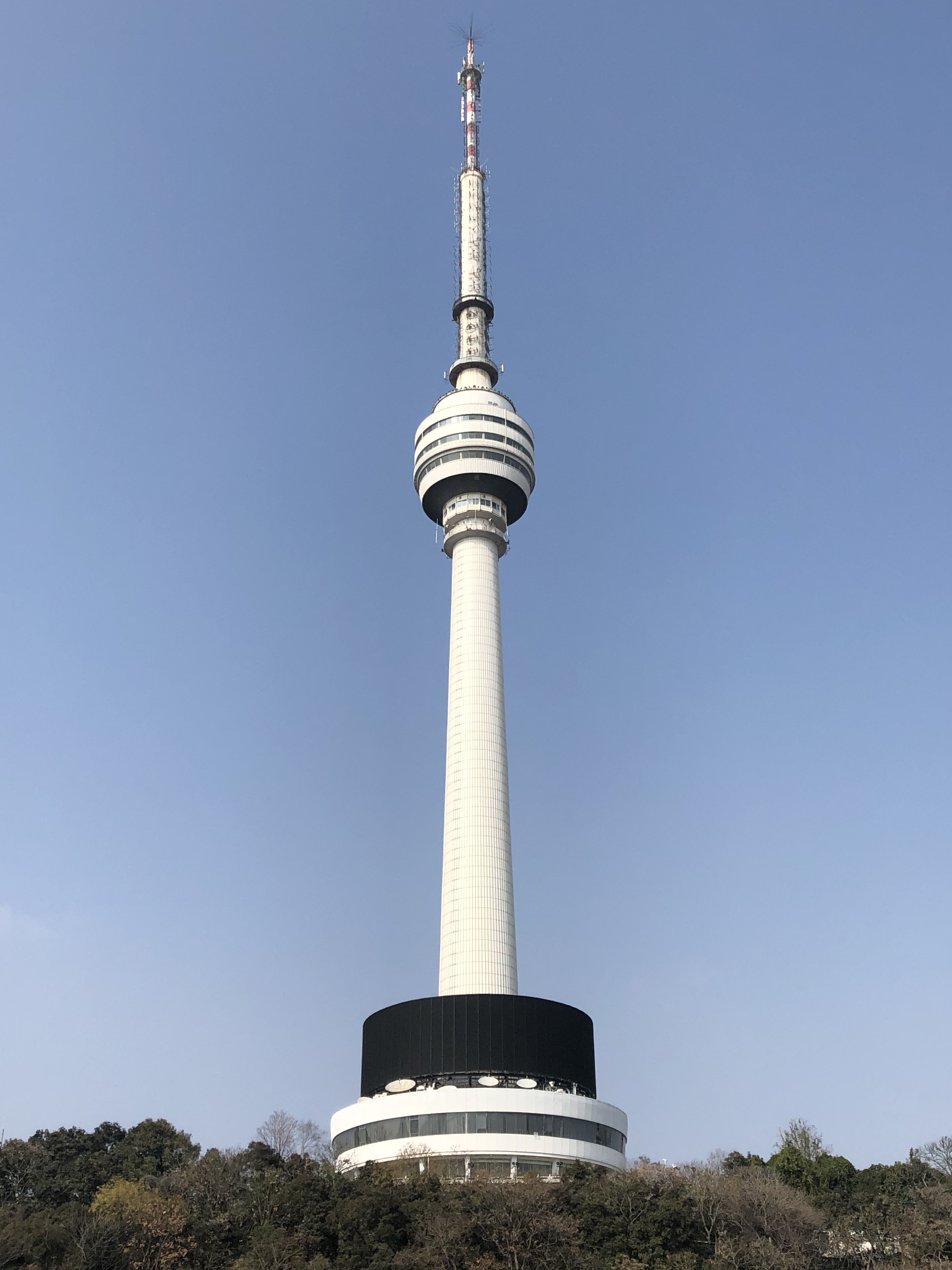
Tortoise Mountain TV Tower

The headquarters of Hubei Television is located in Wuchang District. Tortoise Mountain TV Tower is China's first self-developed TV tower, opened in 1986. The modern newspapers in Wuhan can be dated back to 1866, when Hankow Times, a newspaper in English, was founded. Before 1949, more than 50 newspapers and magazines were published by foreigners in Wuhan. Chao-wen Hsin-pao, founded by Ai Xiaomei in 1873, was the first Chinese newspaper to appear in Hankou (one of the cities that was merged into Wuhan). During the Northern Expedition era (1926–1928), journalism in Wuhan came to a climax; more than 120 newspapers and periodicals, including national newspapers such as Central Daily News and Republican Daily News, were founded or published during this time. Chutian Metropolis Daily and Wuhan Evening News are two major local commercial tabloid newspapers. Both of them have entered the list of 100 most widely circulated newspapers of the world.

== Culture ==
The plum blossom is the city's emblem, chosen partly because of the long history of local plum cultivation and use, and partly to recognize the plum's current economic significance in terms of cultivation and research. Local wild plums were used medicinally during the Qin and Han dynasties. Cultivation of the fruit began during the Song dynasty. Some traditional new year customs revolve around the planting of plums.

=== Language ===
Wuhan natives speak a variety of Southwestern Mandarin Chinese referred to as Wuhan dialect that differs slightly between the districts of Wuhan, including Wuchang dialect in Wuchang District, Hankou dialect in the Hankou districts, Hanyang dialect in Hanyang District, and Qingshan dialect in Qingshan District.

=== Cuisine ===
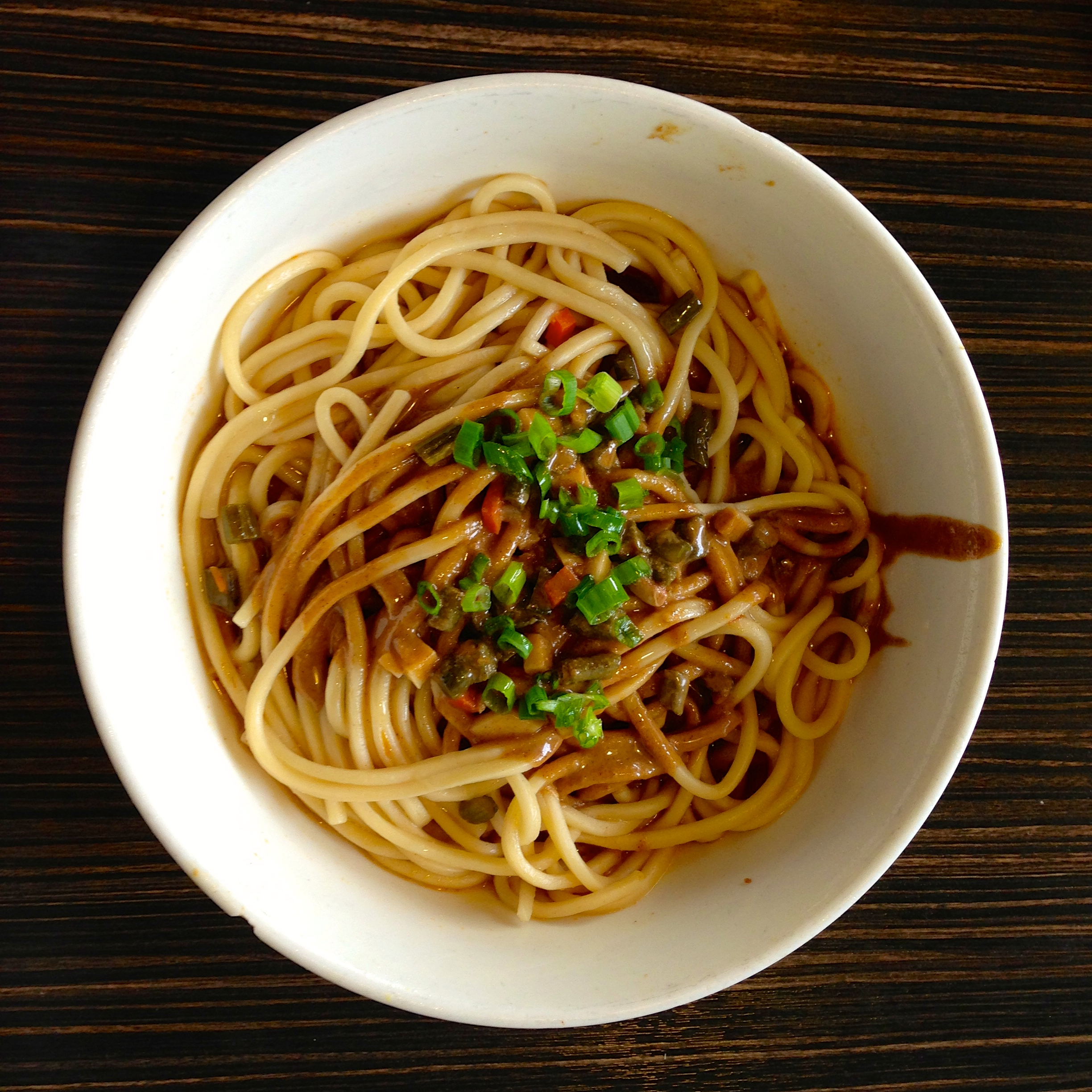
A bowl of hot dry noodles

Hubei cuisine is one of China's ten major styles of cooking. With a history of more than 2,000 years, Hubei cuisine, originating in ancient Chu cuisine, has developed a number of distinctive dishes, such as steamed blunt-snout bream in clear soup, preserved ham with flowering Chinese cabbage, and others. On the third day of the third month of the lunar calendar, many in Wuhan eat dìcài zhǔ jīdàn (地菜煮鸡蛋), an egg dish which is supposed to prevent illness in the coming year.

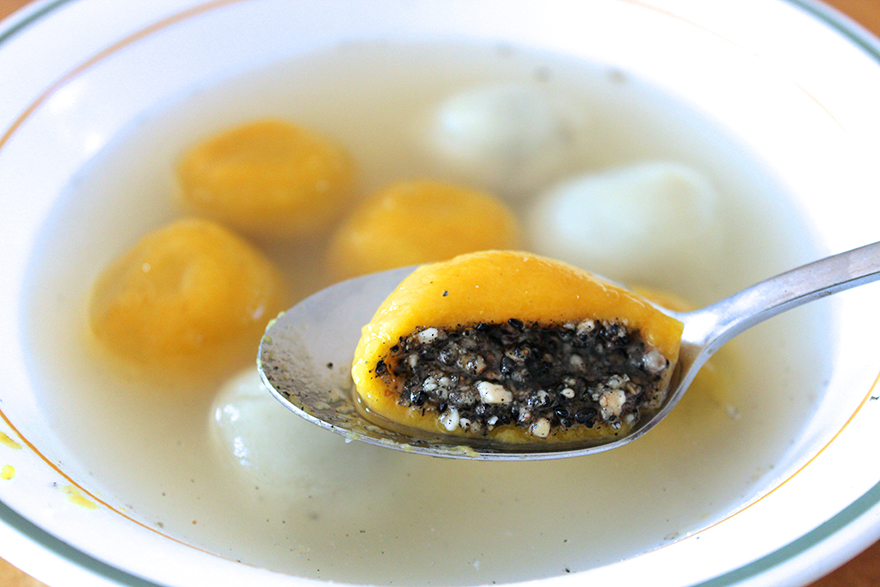
Tangyuan made from glutinous rice flour, filled with black sesame (黑芝麻) paste

"No need to be particular about the recipes; all foods have their own uses. Rice wine and tangyuan are excellent midnight snacks, while fat bream and flowering Chinese cabbages are great delicacies." This attitude expressed in Hankou Zhuzhici reflects indirectly the eating habits and a wide variety of distinctive snacks with a long history in Wuhan, such as Qingshuizong (a pyramid-shaped dumpling made of glutinous rice wrapped in bamboo or reed leaves) in the Period of the Warring States, Chunbinbian in Northern and Southern dynasties, mung bean jelly in the Sui dynasty, youguo (a deep-fried twisted dough stick) in the Song and Yuan dynasties, rice wine and mianwo in the Ming and Qing dynasties, as well as three-delicacy stuffed skin of bean milk, tangbao (steamed dumpling filled with minced meat and gravy) and hot braised noodles (reganmian) in modern times.

Guozao (過早), which literally means "passing the morning", is a popular way to say 'having breakfast' in Wuhan, and a part of the city's culture. As a hub for land transport in China, Wuhan gathers together diverse cuisines from different places. The most famous place to have breakfast is Hubu Street (戶部巷), a 150-meter-long street in the neighborhood of Simenkou (司门口). Along its short length, one can find nearly all the traditional foods of Wuhan.

A list of popular Wuhan breakfast foods:

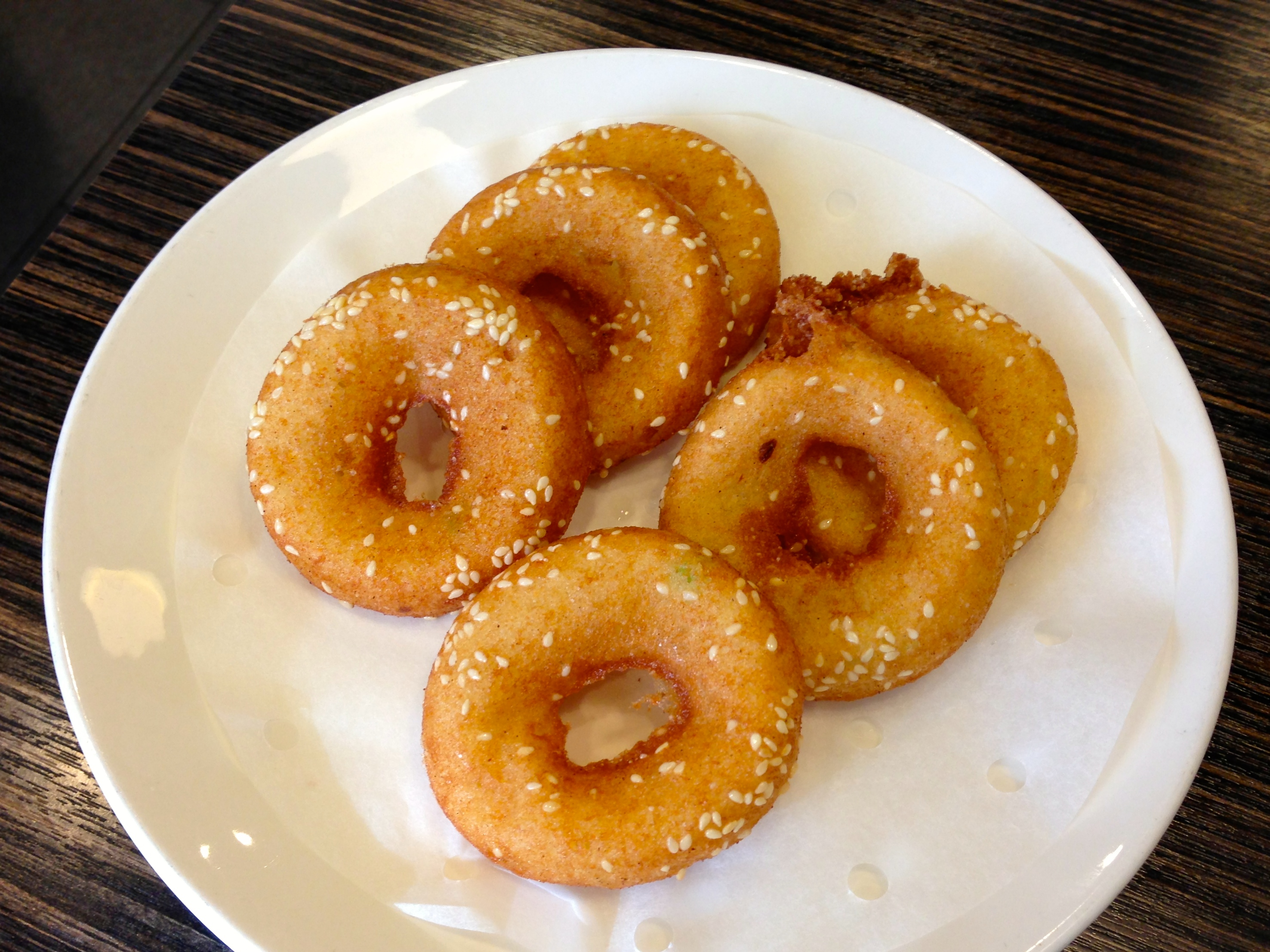
Mianwo, a donut-shaped snack from Wuhan

- Hot dry noodles, also known as reganmian (热干面), are long, freshly boiled noodles mixed with sesame paste. The dish is considered to be the most typical local breakfast food.
- Wuhan duck or yabozi (鸭脖子) is a local version of a popular Chinese duck dish, made of duck necks and spices.
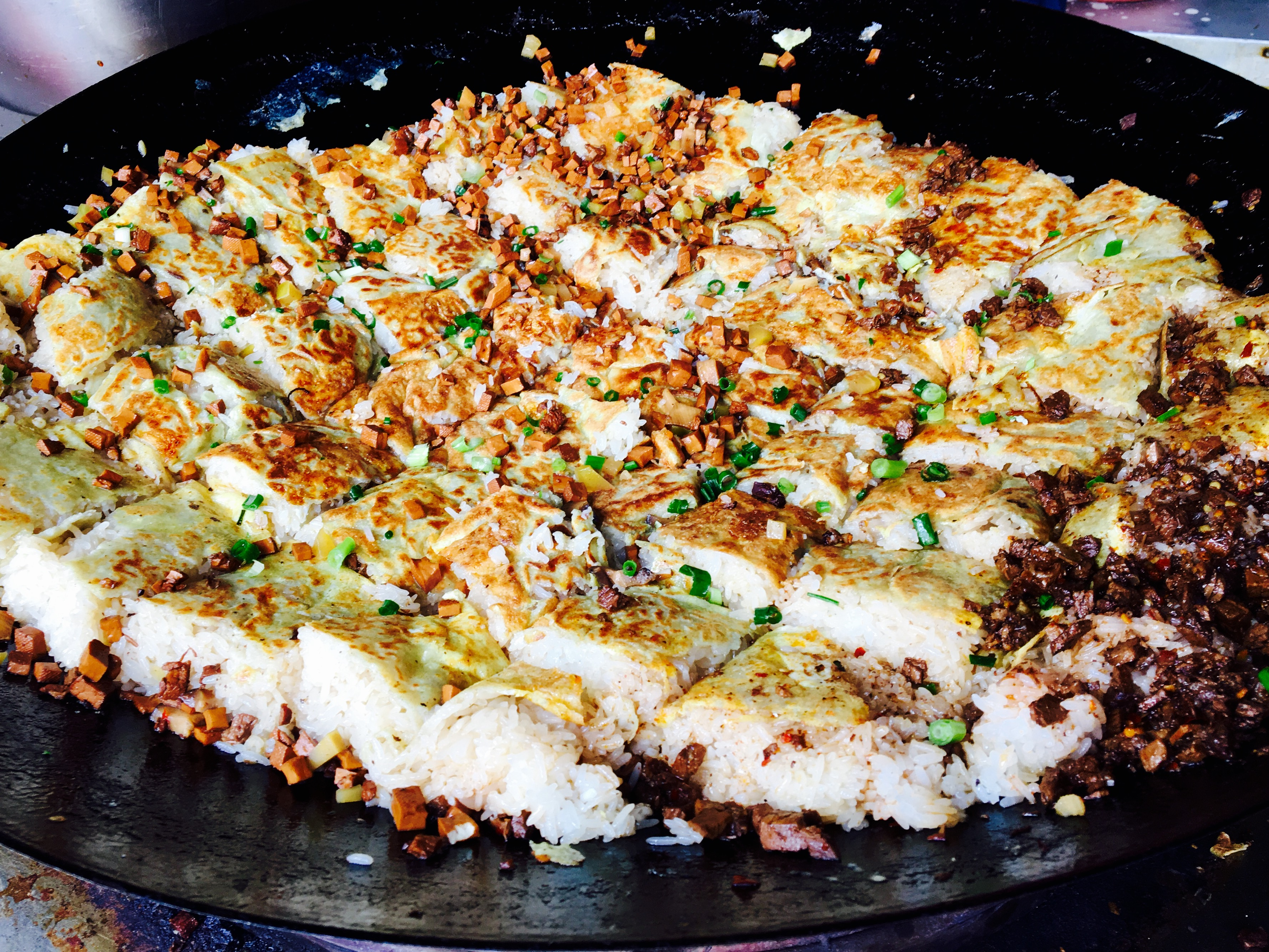
- Freshly made doupi in Wuhan
  Bean skin or doupi (豆皮) is a local dish with a filling of egg, rice, beef, mushrooms and beans cooked between two large round soybean skins and cut into pieces, structurally like a stuffed pizza without enclosing edges.
- Soup dumplings or xiaolongtangbao (小笼汤包) are a kind of dumpling with thin skin made of flour, steamed with very juicy meat inside. The name tang (soup) bao (bun) refers to the fact that when one takes a bite from it, the "soup" inside is liable to spill out.
- A mianwo (麪窩) is a kind of savory donut with a salty taste. It is much thinner than a common donut.
- Shaomai wrapped in fried flatbread (油饼包烧麦): Fried flatbread is filled with pieces of fried shaomai. Heavy frying is required to put diced meat, mushrooms, bamboo shoots, and black pepper in it.
- Thick soup noodles or hutangfen (糊汤粉): A noodle dish that uses round rice noodles as the main ingredient, along with fish paste soup, small shrimp, and chopped green onions for flavor.

=== Opera ===
Han opera, which is the local opera of Wuhan area, was one of China's oldest and most popular operas. During the late Qing dynasty, Han opera, blended with Hui opera, gave birth to Peking opera, the most popular opera in modern China. Thus Han opera has been called the "mother of Peking opera".

=== Sports ===
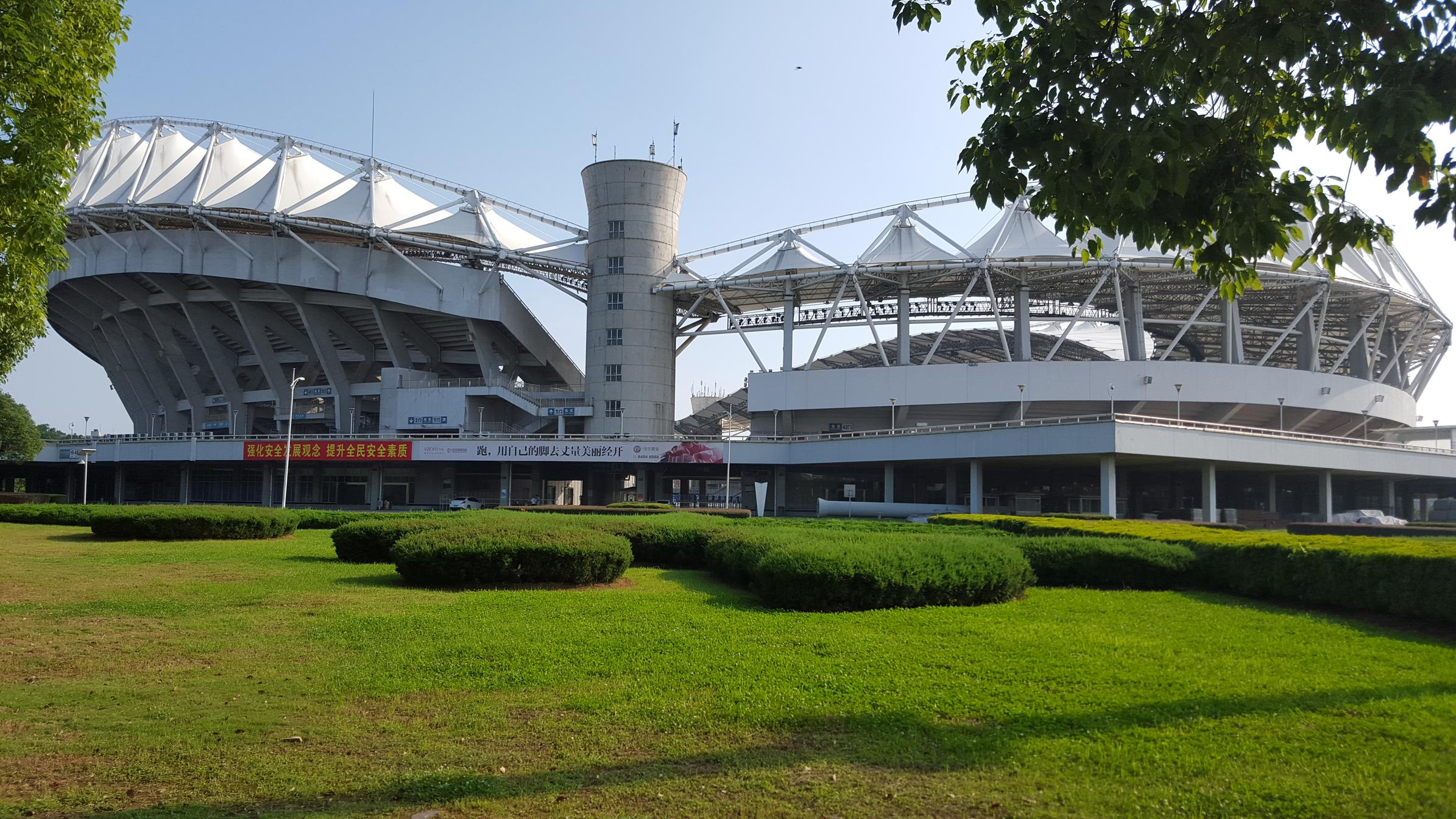
Wuhan Sports Center

Wuhan had a professional football team, Wuhan, that plays in the China League One. Xinhua Road Sport Center, the team's home stadium, with a capacity of 32,137, is located in the heart of the city next to Zhongshan Park. For the 2013 season, Wuhan Zall was promoted to the top-tier league of Chinese football, Chinese Super League, and relocated its home to Wuhan Sports Center Stadium, a modern stadium with 54,357 seats located in the suburbs of the city. However, the team did not play well in the ensuing season and was demoted back to China League One as the 2013 season ended. For financial and transportation reasons, the team moved back to Xinhua Road Sport Center in 2014. In January 2023, the team folded. Wuhan also has the Wuhan Three Towns in the Chinese Super League, who won the title during the 2022 season for the first time upon promotion from China League One.

The Wuhan Gators were a professional arena football team based in Wuhan. They were members of the China Arena Football League (CAFL).

The 13,000-seat Wuhan Sports Center Gymnasium held the 2011 FIBA Asia Championship and was one of the venues for the 2019 FIBA Basketball World Cup. The 7th Military World Games were hosted in Wuhan from October 18 to 27, 2019.

The city has been the venue for the women's tennis tournament, the Wuhan Open, one of the WTA's Premier 5 tournaments, since 2014.

== Architecture ==
=== Bridges ===
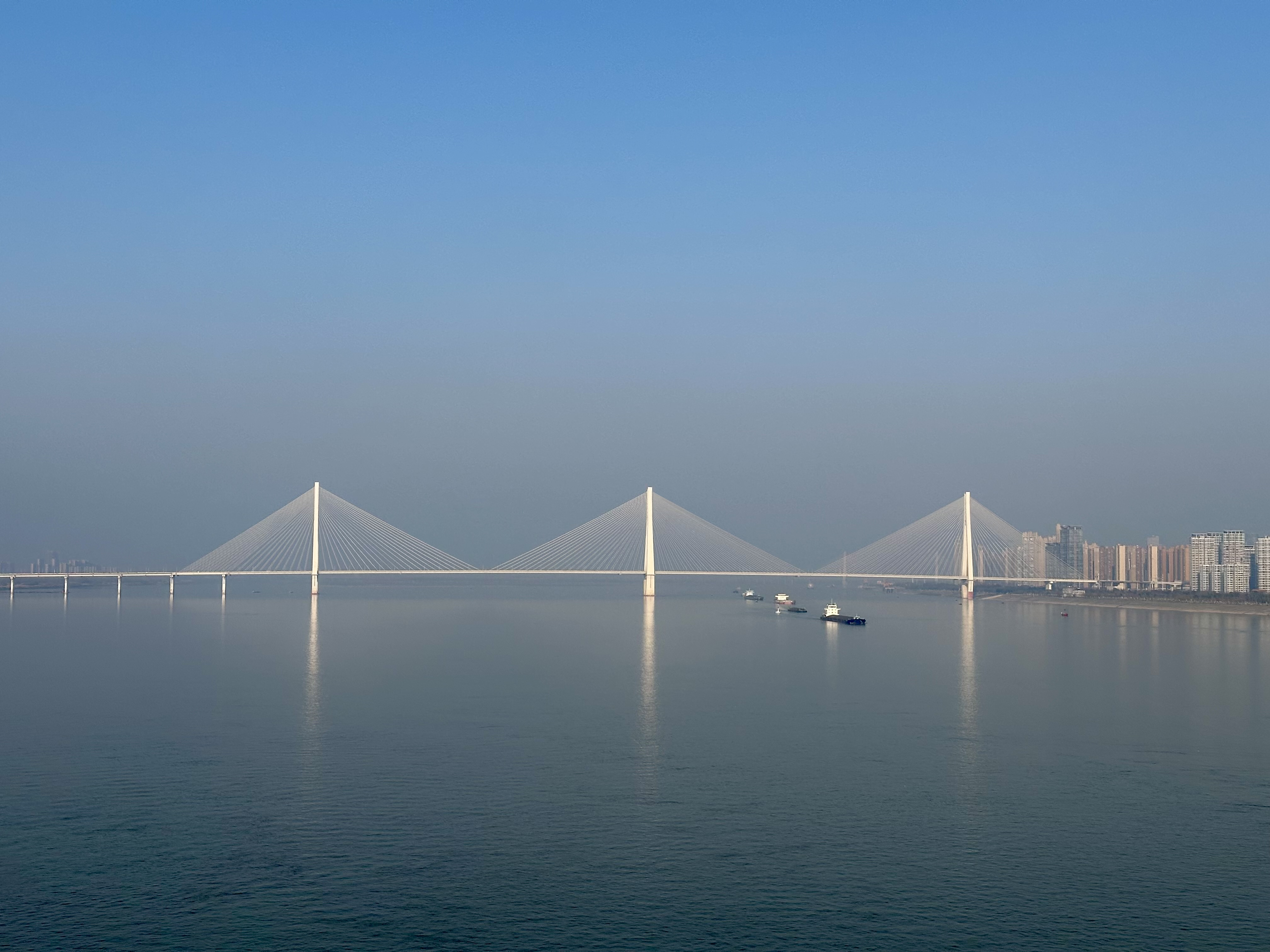
Wuhan Erqi Yangtze River Bridge

Wuhan has eleven bridges and one tunnel across the Yangtze River. The Wuhan Yangtze River Bridge, also called the First Bridge, was built over the Yangtze in 1957, carrying a railroad directly across the river between hills known as Snake Hill and Turtle Hill. Before this bridge was built it could take up to an entire day to barge railcars across. Including its approaches, it is 5,511 feet (1,680 m) long, and it accommodates both a double-track railway on a lower deck and a four-lane roadway above. It was built with the assistance of advisers from the Soviet Union.

The Second Bridge, a cable-stayed bridge built of prestressed concrete, has a central span of 400 meters (1,300 feet); it is 4,678 meters (15,348 feet) in length (including 1,877 meters (6,158 feet) of the main bridge) and 26.5 to 33.5 meters (86.9 to 109.9 feet) in width. Its main bridgeheads are 90 meters (300 feet) high each, pulling 392 thick slanting cables together in the shape of double fans so that the central span of the bridge is well poised on the piers and the bridge's stability and vibration resistance are ensured. With six lanes on the deck, the bridge is designed to handle the daily passage of 50,000 motor vehicles. The bridge was completed in 1995.

The Third Wuhan Yangtze River Bridge, also called Baishazhou Bridge, was completed in September 2000. Located 8.6 kilometers (5.3 miles) southwest of the First Bridge, construction of Baishazhou Bridge started in 1997. With an investment of over 1.4 billion yuan (about US$170,000,000), the bridge, which is 3,586 meters (11,765 feet) long and 26.5 meters (86.9 feet) wide, has six lanes and has a capacity of 50,000 vehicles a day. The bridge is expected to serve as a major passage for the future Wuhan Ring Road, greatly easing the city's traffic and aiding local economic development.

The Yangluo Bridge carries Wuhan's Ring Road across the Yangtze in the city's eastern suburbs (connecting the Hongshan District with the Xinzhou District). It was opened on December 26, 2007.

The Wuhan Tianxingzhou Yangtze River Bridge crosses the Yangtze in the northeastern part of the city, downstream of the Second bridge. It is named after Tianxing Island (Tianxingzhou), above which it crosses the river. Built at a cost of 11 billion yuan, the 4,657-meter cable suspension bridge was opened on December 26, 2009, in time for the opening of the Wuhan railway station. It is a combined road and rail bridge, and carries the Wuhan–Guangzhou high-speed railway across the river.

=== Skyscrapers ===
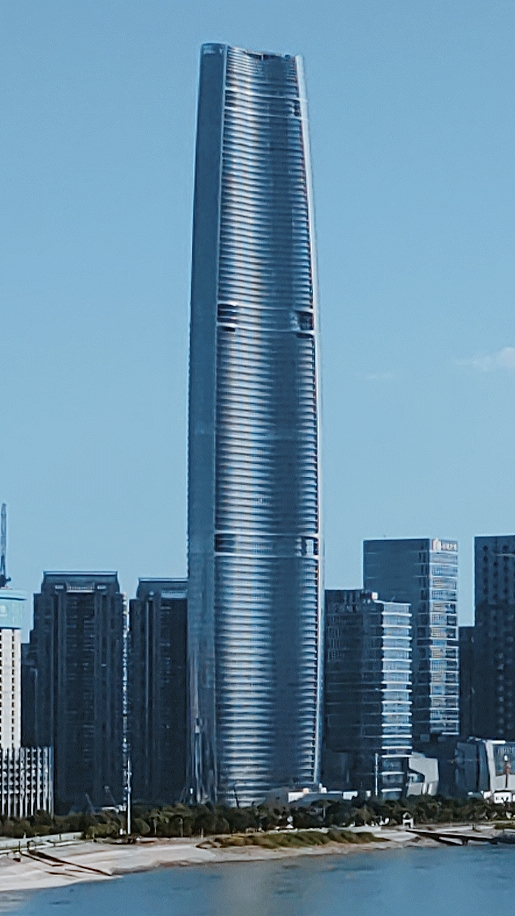
Wuhan Greenland Center, the tallest building in Wuhan since 2023

The Yellow Crane Tower, historically one of the tallest buildings in Wuhan, is considered one of the Four Great Towers of China and was destroyed twelve times, both by warfare and by fire. The tower is classified as an AAAAA scenic area by the China National Tourism Administration. At 475.6 meters (1,560 ft) in height, the Wuhan Greenland Center is the tallest skyscraper in Wuhan and in Central China, as well as the eighth tallest building in China.

The Wuhan Center, the second tallest skyscraper in Wuhan, was the tallest building in the city when it was completed in 2019. It retained the title until Wuhan Greenland Center surpassed it in 2023. Riverview Plaza is a 376 meters (1,234 ft) tall skyscraper located in Wuhan. It was completed in 2021 and is currently the third tallest building in the city. The Phoenix Towers are proposed supertall skyscrapers planned for construction in Wuhan. At 1 kilometer (3,300 ft) high, the towers would be among the tallest structures in the world when completed.

== Notable people ==
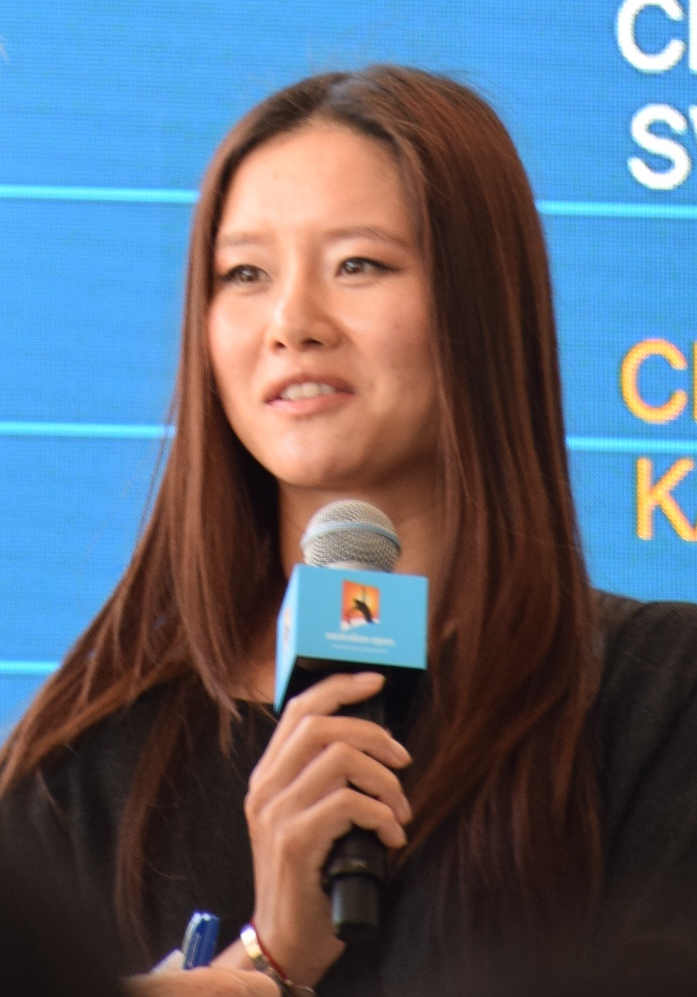
Li Na, a former professional tennis player and two-time Grand Slam champion

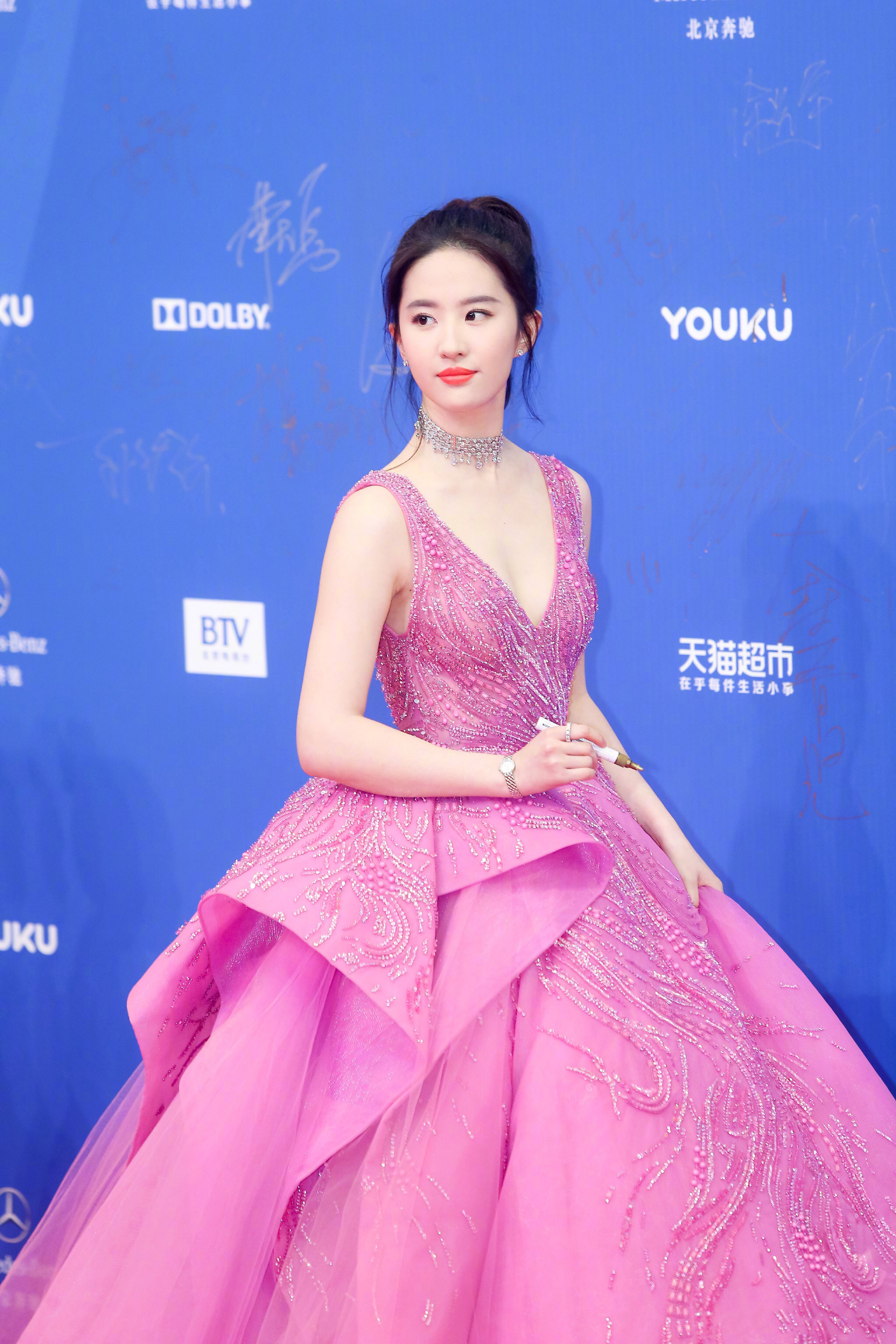
Liu Yifei, actress

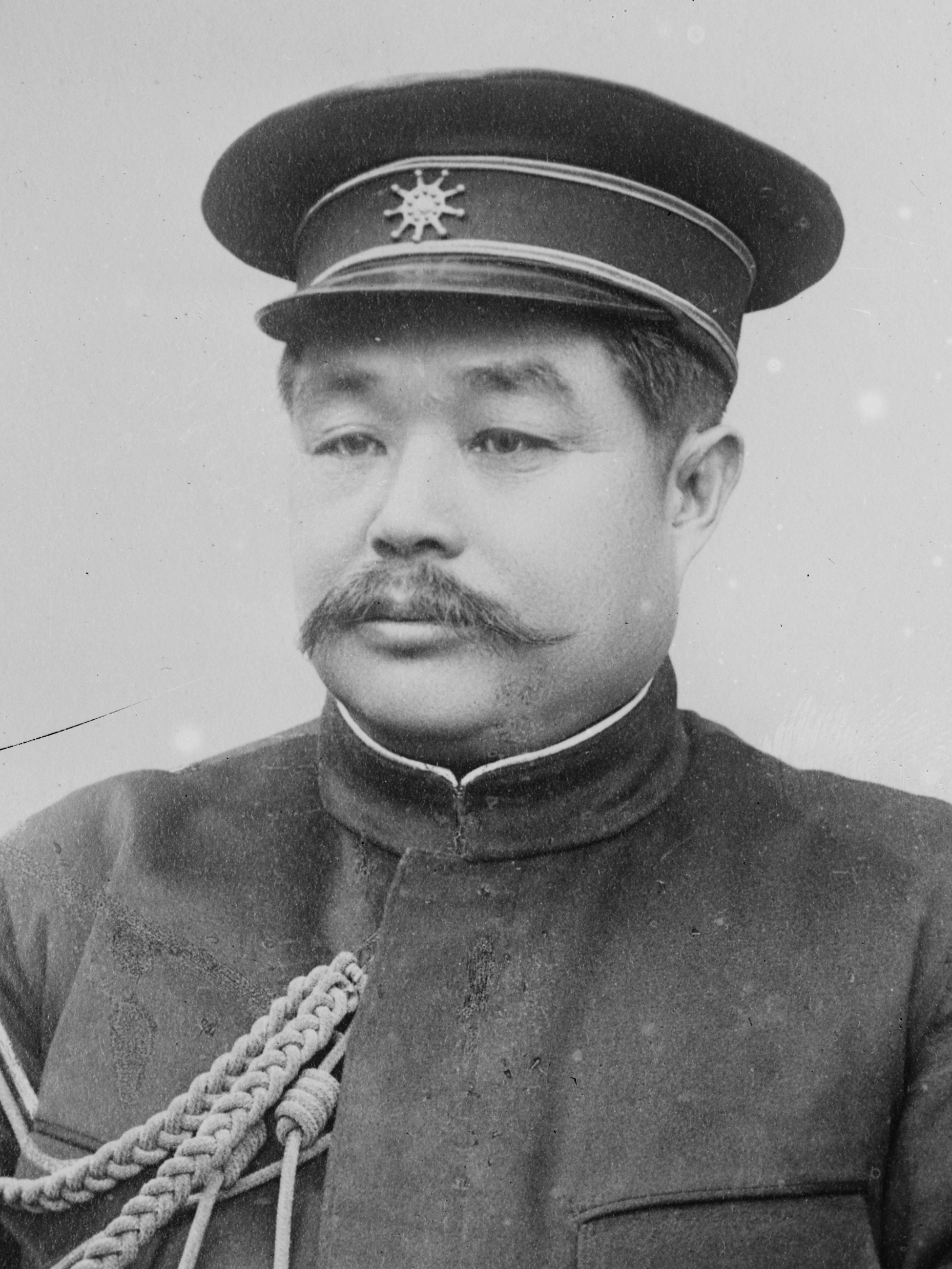
President Li Yuanhong

=== Politics ===
- Li Yuanhong – former President of the Republic of China (1916–17, 1922–23).
- Wu Yi – former Vice-Premier and Minister of Health of the People's Republic of China
- Wei Wenbo – former Minister of Justice and founding president of East China University of Political Science and Law

=== Business ===
- Wei Brian – Chinese entrepreneur

=== Science ===
- Chang-Lin Tien – seventh Chancellor of the University of California, Berkeley (1990–1997) and a major founder of the U.S. National Academy of Engineering (NAE). Professor Tien is the first Asian to head a top university in the United States.
- E Dongchen – "father of polar surveying and mapping" in China
- Long Lehao – Aerospace engineer and the chief designer of Long March expendable launch system rockets
- Weiping Zou – Charles B. de Nancrede Professor of Pathology, Immunology, Biology, and Surgery at the University of Michigan, American Association for Cancer Research Cancer Immunology (CIMM) Chairperson 2018–2019, Abstract Programming Chair for the American Association of Immunologists

=== Sports ===
- Deng Zhuoxiang – professional football player, scored many goals for Chinese national team in important games including 3:0 South Korea and 1:0 France in 2010.
- Fu Mingxia – female diver, four-time Olympic Gold Medalist (one in Barcelona 1992, two in Atlanta 1996, one in Sydney 2000), the only diver that has won gold medals at three Olympics as well as one of the very few divers in the world who is able to win world championships in both platform diving and springboard diving.
- Gao Ling – professional badminton player, two-time Olympic gold medalist (Sydney 2000, Athens 2004).
- Hao Junmin – professional football player, played for Schalke 04 in the German League.
- Hu Jia – Chinese diver who won the gold medal at the 2004 Summer Olympics in the men's 10 meter platform.
- Mei Fang – Chinese footballer playing for Guangzhou Evergrande in the Chinese Super League.
- Li Na – former tennis player, champion of the French Open 2011 and Australian Open 2014.
- Li Ting – tennis player, Olympic gold medalist (in women's doubles, Athens 2004).
- Liang Patti – Chinese American acrobat.
- Qiao Hong – female table tennis player, two-time Olympic gold medalist (in women's doubles, Barcelona 1992, Atlanta 1996).
- Rong Hao – professional football player, with six Chinese Super League titles and two AFC Champions League champion titles.
- Tang Jieli – AIBA Women's Boxing World Champion.
- Xiao Hailiang – Chinese diver, Olympic gold medalist (in 3-meter (9.8-foot) springboard synchronized diving, Sydney 2000).
- Zeng Cheng – professional football player, with six Chinese Super League titles and two AFC Champions League champion titles.
- Zhou Jihong – female diver, Olympic gold medalist (Los Angeles 1984), the first Chinese athlete to win an Olympic gold medal in diving.
- Tian Tao – Olympic weightlifter
- Lü Xiaojun – Olympic weightlifter

=== Arts ===
- Chi Li – writer
- Han Dong – singer, member of Dreamcatcher
- Jayne Meadows – actress
- Laura Gao, graphic novelist, author of Messy Roots
- Liu Yifei – actress and singer. Childhood friend with Yao Beina
- Paula Tsui – singer who spent most of her singing career in Hong Kong
- Peng Xiuwen – composer and conductor
- Sunny Xie – singer and actress
- Tian Yuan – singer and actress
- Wang Kai – actor
- Wang Xiaosong – artist who studied in Germany and is now professor at Zhejiang University in Hangzhou
- Xie Fang – actress and author
- Xu Fan – actress
- Yan Wenjing – writer whose work is included as one of the literary selections on the Putonghua Proficiency Test.
- Yang Caiyu – actress
- Yao Beina – singer, (during 2005–2015) known as the "Voice of China", spiritual leader of organ donation and charity (1981–2015).
- Yin Yezi – actress
- Ying Chang Compestine, a Chinese American author, speaker, television host and chef
- Yuan Hong – actor
- Zhao Yue - actress and singer, member of SNH48 and BonBon Girls 303
- Zhou Mi – singer, member of Super Junior M
- Zhu Yilong – actor

=== Other fields ===
- Saint Francis Regis Clet was martyred here
- Hua Mulan – Ancient Chinese heroine whose story has been passed through ages in China and has been presented in a great number of books and motion pictures, including the Disney animated feature Mulan (1998).
- Samuel David Hawkins - American soldier in the Korean War who was captured by the North, subsequently defected to China at the time of the Korean Armistice Agreement. He worked as a mechanic in Wuhan until 1957.
- Wu Shuqing – female revolutionary and militia leader during the Xinhai Revolution
- Xiong Bingkun (熊秉坤) – the soldier who started and led the Wuhan Uprising in the 1911 Revolution which gave birth to the Republic of China, Asia's first republic country.
- Ai Jingjing – Chinese novelist.

== Sister cities ==
Wuhan is twinned with:

Sister cities of Wuhan
1. Manchester 2. Swansea 3. Essonne 4. Bordeaux 5. Duisburg 6. Sankt Pölten 7. Győr

City	Country	Since
Ōita	Japan	September 7, 1979
Pittsburgh	United States	September 8, 1982
Duisburg	Germany	October 8, 1982
Manchester	United Kingdom	September 16, 1986
Galați	Romania	August 12, 1987
Kyiv	Ukraine	October 19, 1990
Khartoum	Sudan	September 27, 1995
Győr	Hungary	October 19, 1995
Bordeaux	France	June 18, 1998
Cheongju	South Korea	October 29, 2000
Sankt Pölten	Austria	December 20, 2005
Christchurch	New Zealand	April 4, 2006
Markham	Canada	September 12, 2006
Kópavogur	Iceland	April 25, 2008
Ashdod	Israel	November 8, 2011
Essonne (not a city but a department)	France	December 21, 2012
İzmir	Turkey	June 6, 2013
Tijuana	Mexico	July 12, 2013
Saratov	Russia	August 7, 2015
Concepción	Chile	April 7, 2016
Bishkek	Kyrgyzstan	November 15, 2016
Chalcis	Greece	May 11, 2017
Izhevsk	Russia	June 16, 2017
Swansea	United Kingdom	January 31, 2018
Entebbe	Uganda	April 13, 2018
Bangkok	Thailand	November 16, 2018

And Wuhan has friendly exchange relationships with:

City	Country	Since
Kobe	Japan	February 16, 1998
Hirosaki	Japan	October 17, 2003
St. Louis	United States	September 27, 2004
Atlanta	United States	September 9, 2006
Daejeon	South Korea	November 1, 2006
Gwangju	South Korea	September 6, 2007
Kolkata	India	July 24, 2008
Suwon	South Korea	December 5, 2008
Taebaek	South Korea	December 5, 2008
Columbus	United States	October 30, 2009
Bremen	Germany	November 6, 2009
Port Louis	Mauritius	November 10, 2009
Cebu City	Philippines	August 19, 2011
Yogyakarta	Indonesia	November 12, 2011
Perm	Russia	September 10, 2012
Chicago	United States	September 20, 2012
Košice	Slovakia	November 6, 2012
Naples	Italy	September 18, 2012
Moselle	France	July 16, 2013
San Francisco	United States	November 21, 2013
Siem Reap Province	Cambodia	November 21, 2013
Biratnagar	Nepal	November 21, 2013
Bangkok	Thailand	November 21, 2013
Częstochowa	Poland	March 14, 2014
Oliveira de Azeméis	Portugal	April 11, 2014
Sydney	Australia	May 30, 2014
Durban	South Africa	June 2014
Burlingame, California	United States	June 23, 2014
Menlo Park, California	United States	June 23, 2014
Cupertino, California	United States	June 23, 2014
East Palo Alto, California	United States	June 23, 2014
Hayward, California	United States	June 23, 2014
Millbrae, California	United States	June 23, 2014
Moraga, California	United States	June 23, 2014
Morgan Hill, California	United States	June 23, 2014
Mountain View, California	United States	June 23, 2014
Oakley, California	United States	June 23, 2014
Union City, California	United States	June 23, 2014
Betong	Thailand	June 25, 2014
Salo	Finland	August 25, 2014
Gävle	Sweden	August 27, 2014
Patan	Nepal	October 20, 2014
Pattaya	Thailand	October 24, 2014
Berane	Montenegro	October 24, 2014
Córdoba	Argentina	October 24, 2014
Liège	Belgium	October 29, 2014
Lille	France	November 3, 2014
Holbæk	Denmark	November 24, 2014
Heraklion	Greece	December 11, 2014
Cape Town	South Africa	December 9, 2014
São Luís	Brazil	April 29, 2015
Varaždin	Croatia	May 7, 2015
Kota Kinabalu	Malaysia	May 20, 2015
Erdőkertes, Pest Megye	Hungary	July 4, 2015
Gold Coast	Australia	September 29, 2015
Le Mans	France	November 1, 2015
Southern Province	Sri Lanka	December 3, 2015
Galle	Sri Lanka	December 5, 2015
Mungyeong	South Korea	December 22, 2015
Daegu	South Korea	March 25, 2016
Tacoma	United States	April 5, 2016
Lima	Peru	April 8, 2016
Tabriz	Iran	May 28, 2016
Marrakesh	Morocco	June 3, 2016
Phnom Penh	Cambodia	July 11, 2016
Dublin	Ireland	September 5, 2016
Houston	United States	September 10, 2016
Jinja	Uganda	September 20, 2016
Pucallpa	Peru	September 20, 2016
Maribor	Slovenia	September 23, 2016
Montego Bay	Jamaica	September 28, 2016
Victoria	Seychelles	October 17, 2016
Kemi	Finland	November 25, 2016
San Nicolás de los Arroyos	Argentina	December 16, 2016
Foz do Iguaçu	Brazil	March 9, 2017
Dunkirk	France	March 20, 2017
Jihlava	Czech Republic	May 10, 2017
Brest	Belarus	August 29, 2017
Zhytomyr	Ukraine	November 14, 2017
Marseille	France	November 20, 2017
Herstal	Belgium	May 21, 2018
Fergana	Uzbekistan	October 14, 2018

=== Former twinnings ===
The city of Arnhem has unilaterally ended its twinning with Wuhan on July 21, 2021, citing concerns about the persecution of Uyghurs in China.

City	Country	From	Until
Arnhem	Netherlands	September 6, 1999	July 21, 2021

== Nature and wildlife ==
In Chinese mythology, the Baiji ("Yangtze River dolphin") has many origin stories. In one legend, the Baiji was the daughter of a general who was deported from the city of Wuhan during a war. During his duty, the daughter ran away. Later, the general met a woman who told him how her father was a general, and when he realized that she was his daughter, he threw himself into the river out of shame. The daughter ran after him and also fell into the river. Before they were drowned, the daughter was transformed into a dolphin, and the general a porpoise.

== See also ==
- Historical capitals of China
- List of cities in the People's Republic of China by population
- List of current and former capitals of subnational entities of China
- Changjiang Daily
- New first-tier city

== Sources ==
- de Crespigny, Rafe (1990), Generals of the South: The foundation and early history of the Three Kingdoms state of Wu, Canberra: Australian National University. Internet Edition 2004.
- Taylor, Jay (2009), The Generalissimo: Chiang Kai-shek and the Struggle for Modern China, The Belknap Press of Harvard University Press

Preceded by Guangzhou	Capital of China; 1927	Succeeded by Nanjing
Preceded by Nanjing	(wartime) Capital of China; 1937	Succeeded by Chongqing (wartime)
