= Hubei cuisine =

Cuisine of Hubei province, China

- Chinese: 湖北菜
Transcriptions
Standard Mandarin
- Hanyu Pinyin: Húběi cài

Chu cuisine
- Chinese: 楚菜
Transcriptions
Standard Mandarin
- Hanyu Pinyin: Chǔ cài

Hubei cuisine, also known as Chu cuisine or E cuisine, is derived from the native cooking styles of Hubei Province in China.

== History ==
Hubei cuisine has a history of more than 2,000 years. The names of dishes and cuisine styles can be found in ancient literature such as Chuci of Qu Yuan.

== Ingredients ==
As Hubei has plenty of lakes, rivers and marshlands, freshwater produce are used as major ingredients in the local cuisine. A key ingredient that is found within many Hubei-style dishes is the lotus root.

== Style ==
Hubei cuisine emphasizes the preparation of ingredients and the matching of colors. It specializes in steaming techniques. Its style is influenced by the cooking methods of the cuisines of neighboring provinces such as Sichuan and Hunan. As a result, Hubei cuisine also uses dried hot pepper, black pepper and other spices to enhance the flavor of dishes.

Hubei cuisine comprises four distinct styles:

- Wuhan style specializes in soups as well as noodle dishes, such as hot dry noodles. Additionally, Wuhan is famous for its dry pots, which are similar to hot pot but without the soup base.
- Huangzhou style, which is more oily and tastes more salty than the others.
- Jingzhou style, which specializes in fish dishes and uses steaming as the primary method of cooking.
- Miao people style, which tastes thick, with the sour and hot most outstanding. It is found in the southwest of Hubei province.

=== Signature dishes ===
English	Traditional Chinese	Simplified Chinese	Pinyin	Notes
Three-delicacy dried bean curd sheet (doupi)	三鮮豆皮	三鲜豆皮	sān xiān dòu pí	
Hot dry noodles	熱乾麵	热干面	rè gān miàn	
Fish cakes and ball	魚糕丸子	鱼糕丸子	yú gāo wán zi	
Mianyang three kinds of steamed food	沔陽三蒸	沔阳三蒸	miǎn yáng sān zhēng	

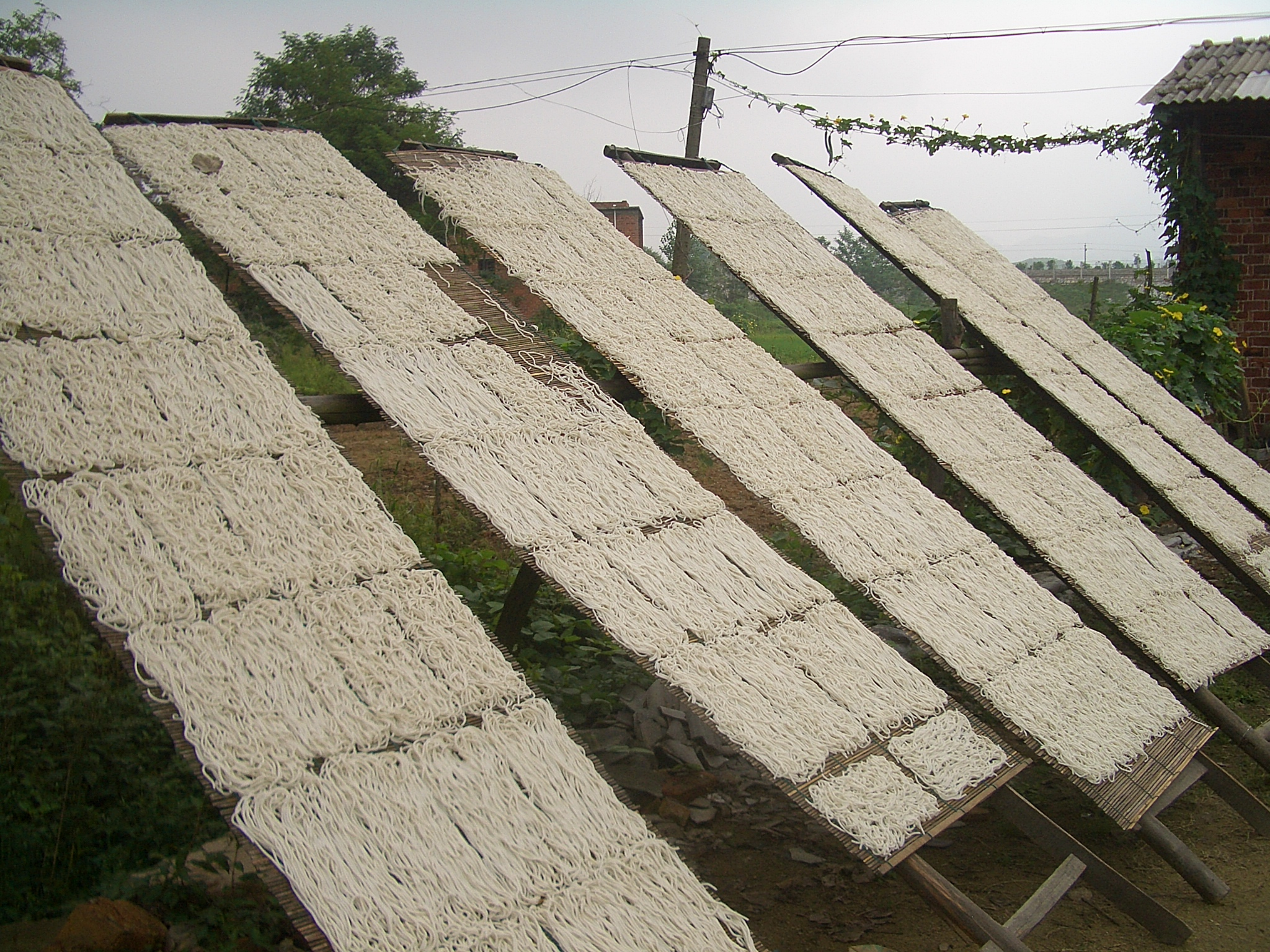
Freshly made noodles drying in the sun in Futu, Huangshi Municipality

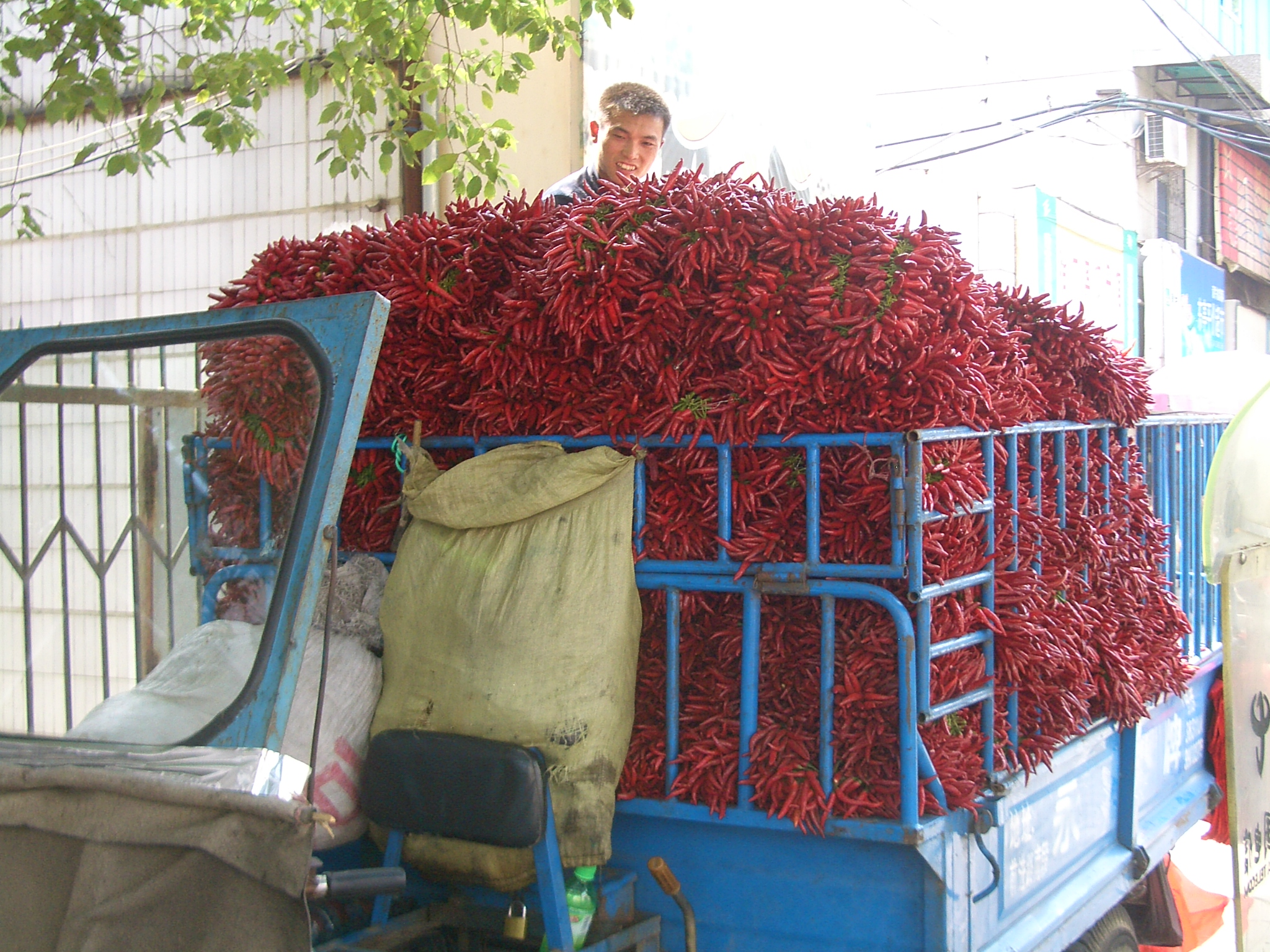
Chilli peppers sold in Wuhan

== Gallery ==
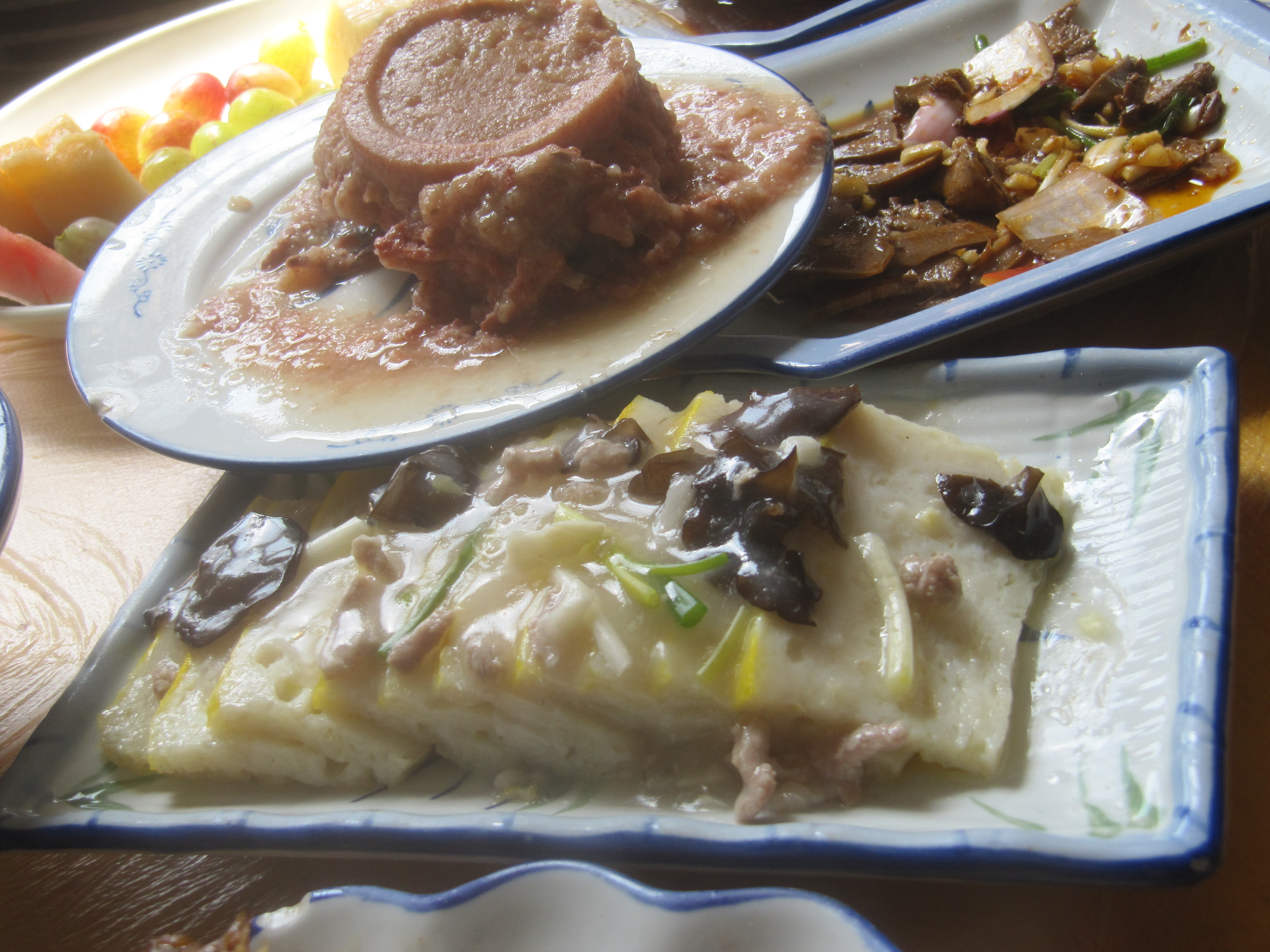
Steamed fish cakes

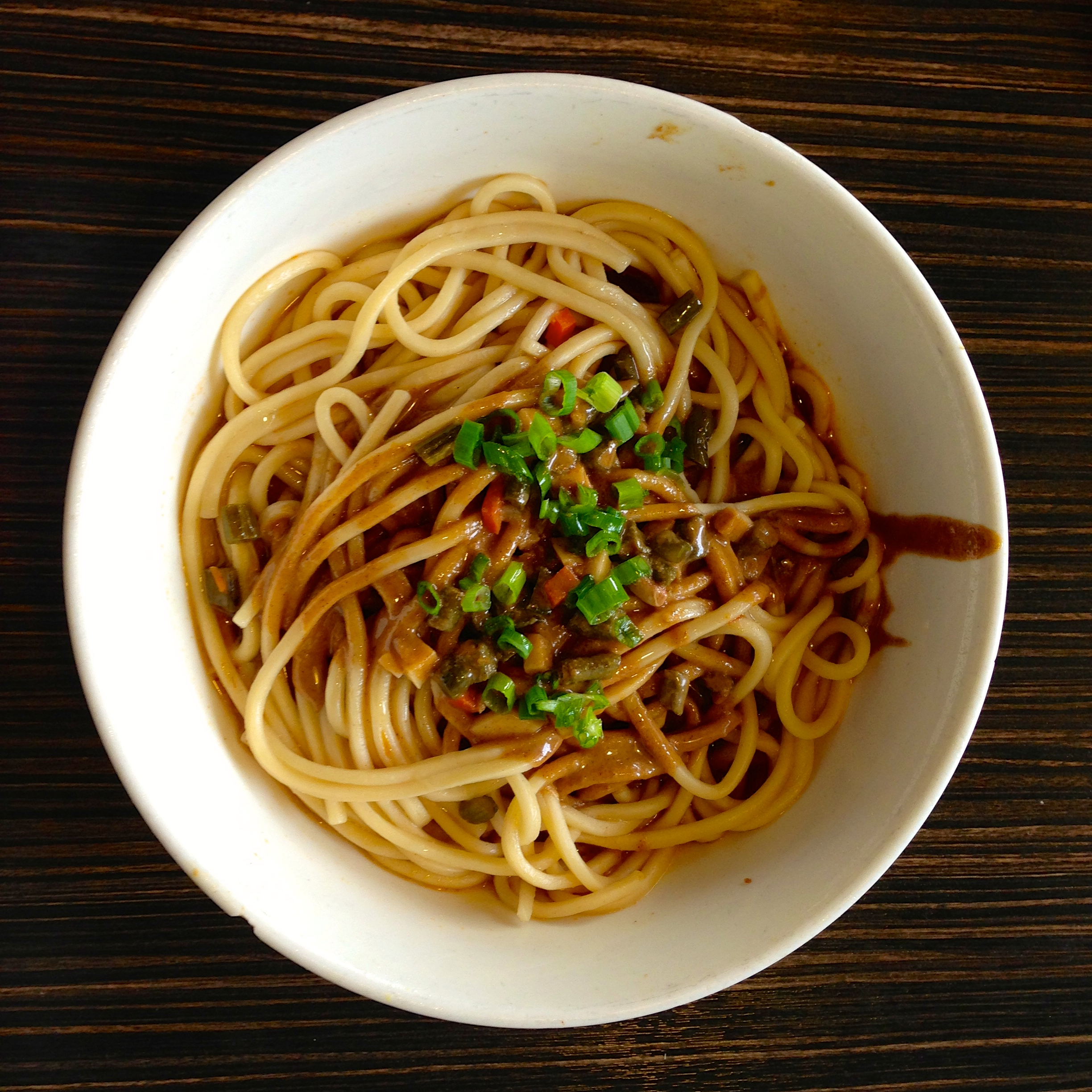
Reganmian, the hot dry noodles

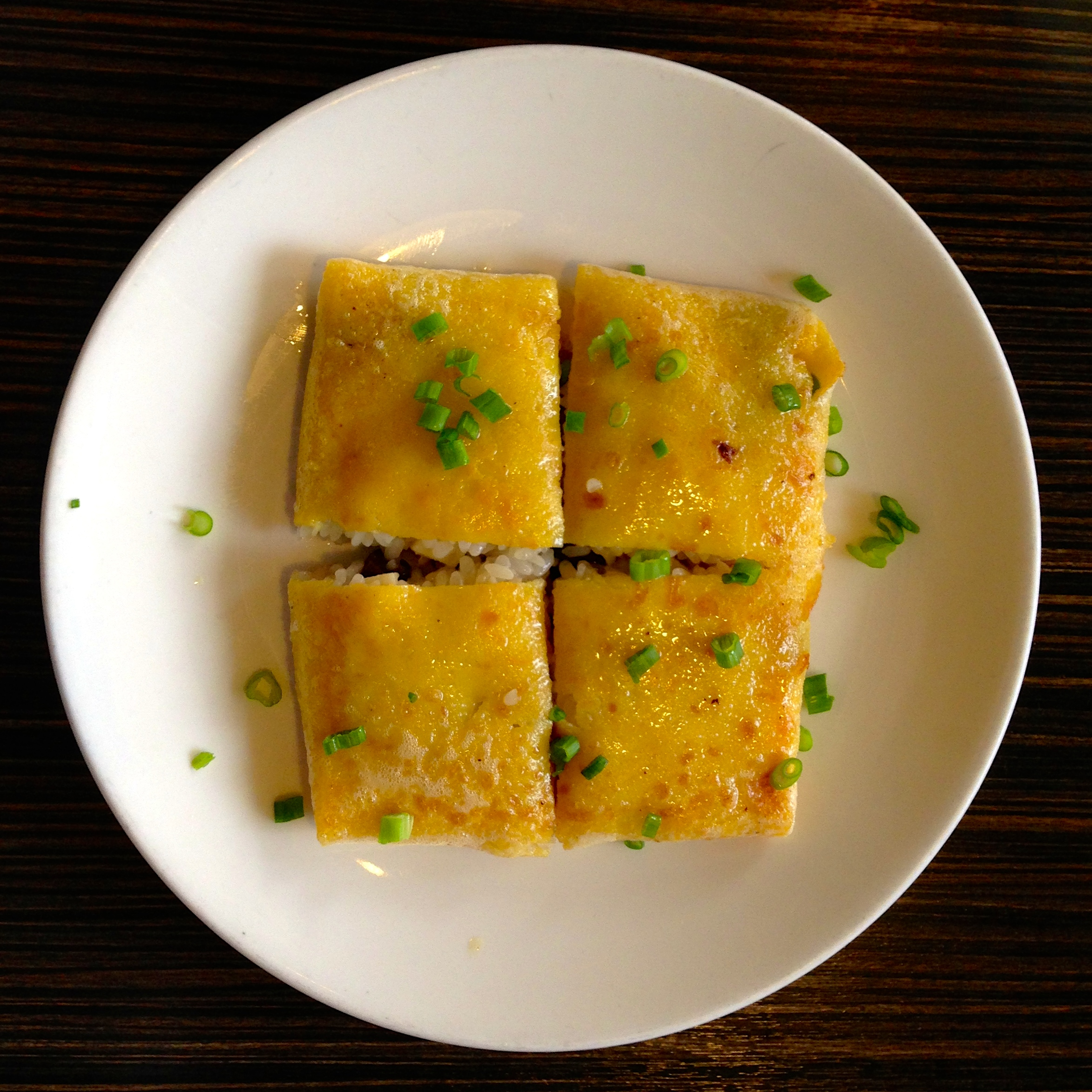
Doupi, named after its outside layer made of green bean powder and eggs

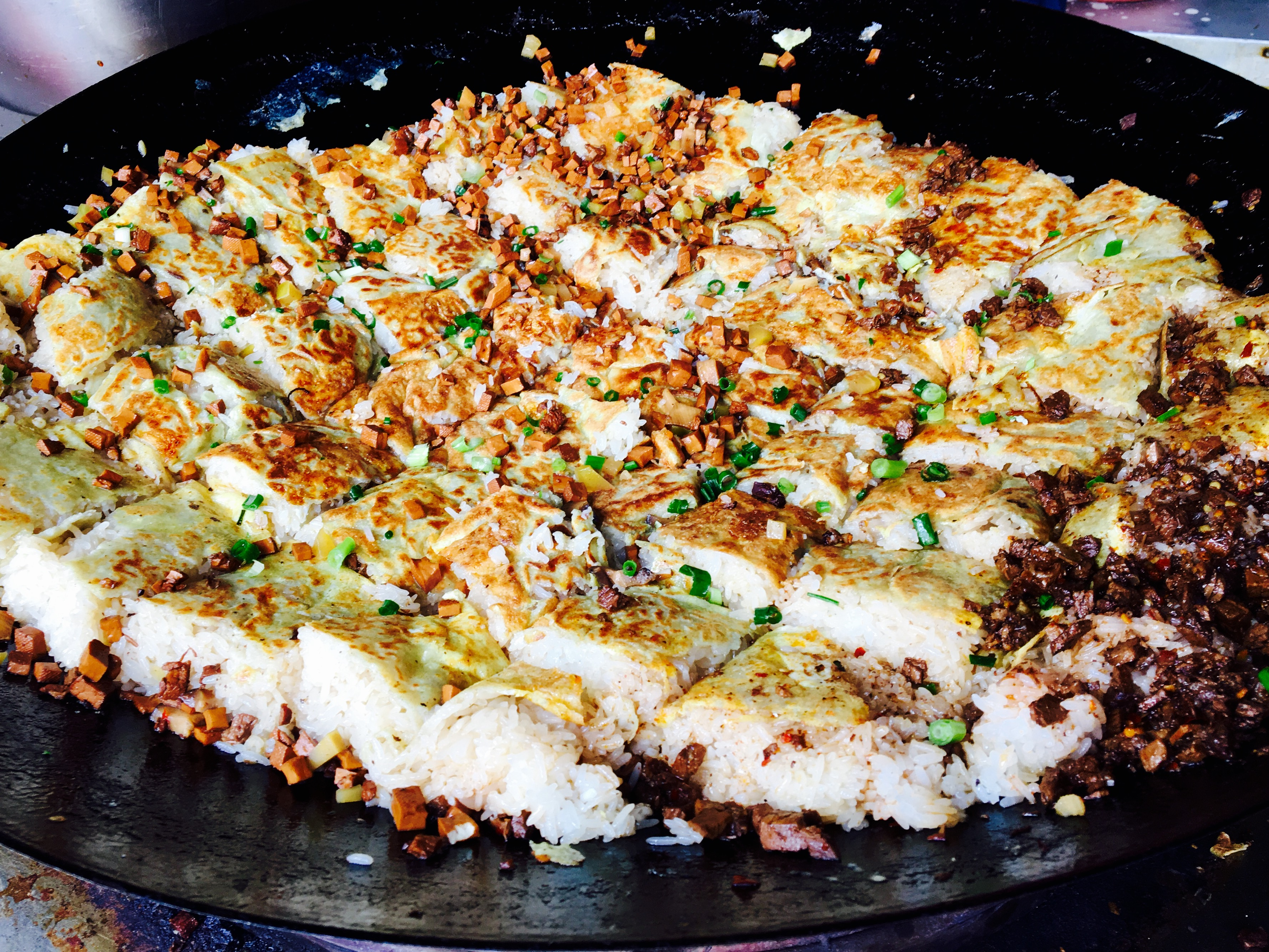
Doupi

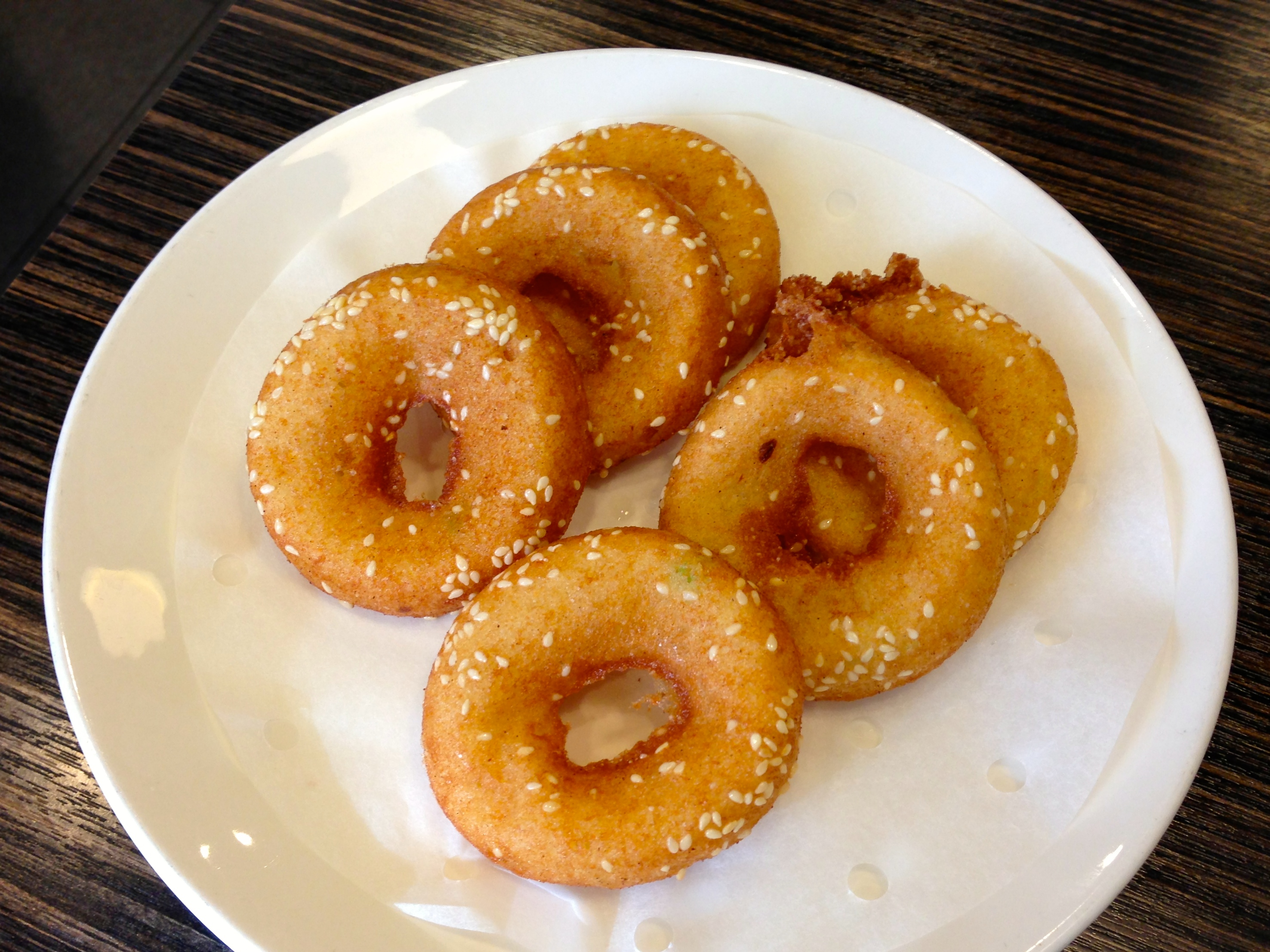
Mianwo, deep-fried salty doughnut

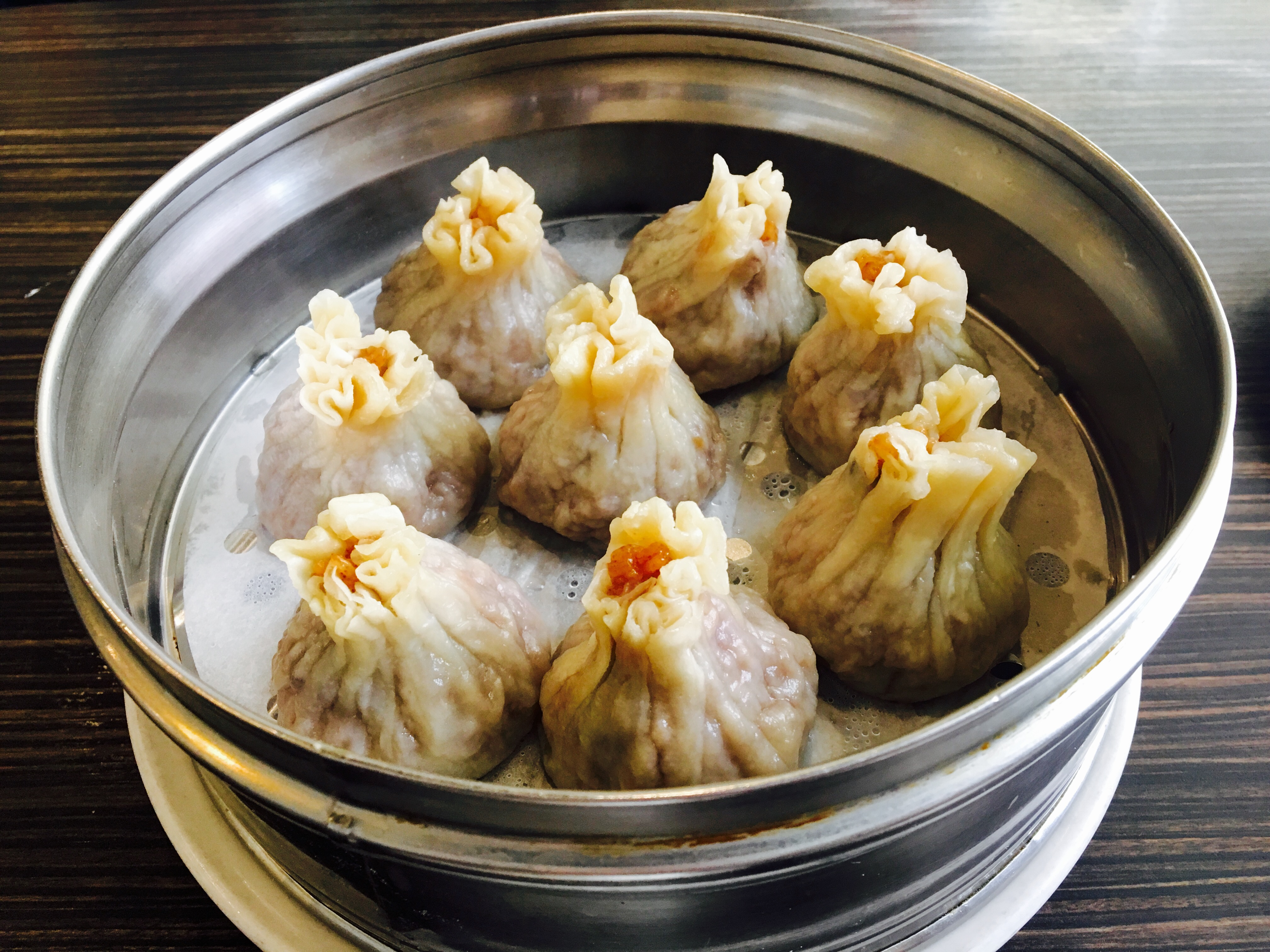
Shaomei, a local variety of Shumai

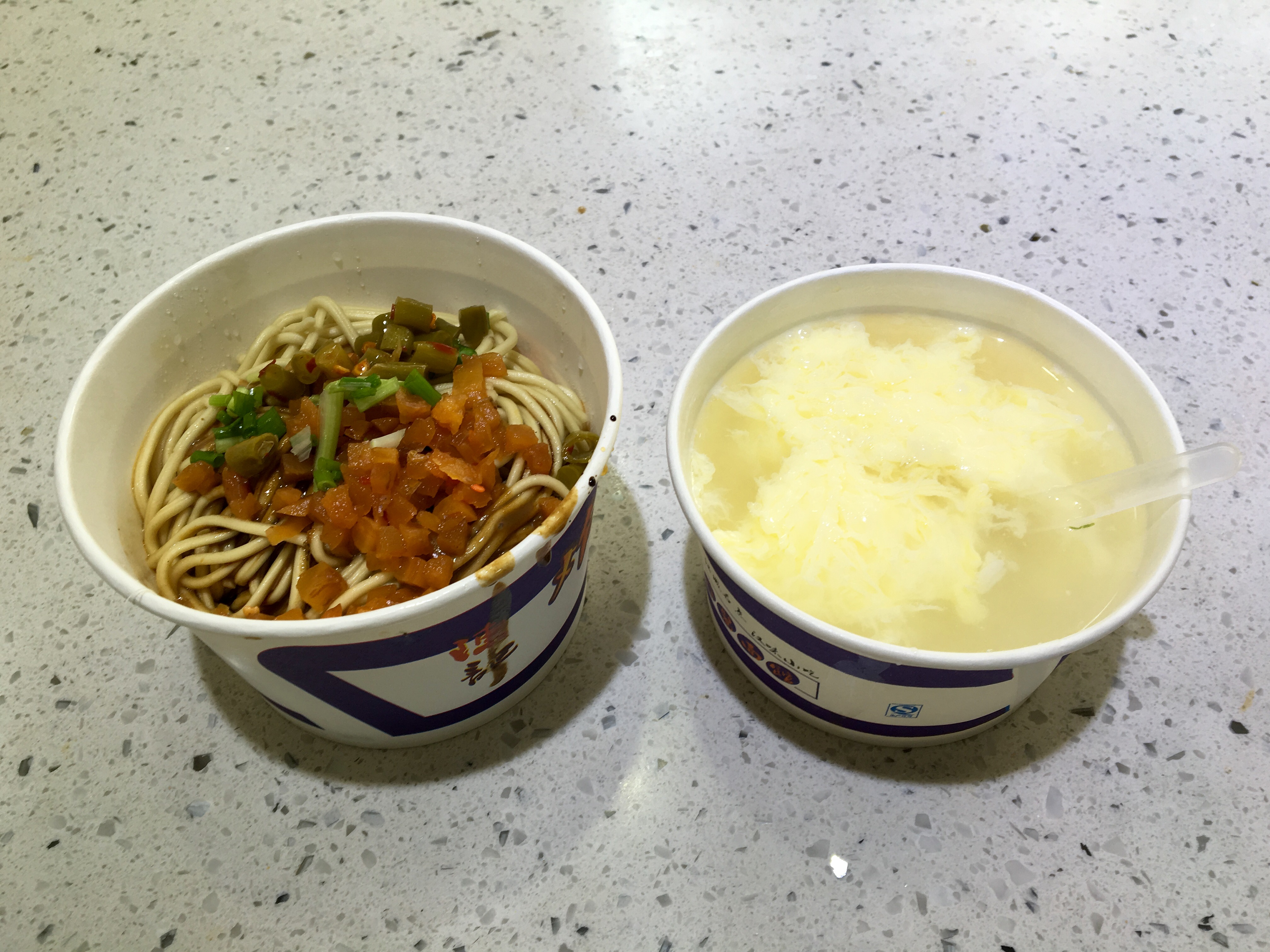
Hot dry noodles and Danjiu (sweet rice wine with eggs)

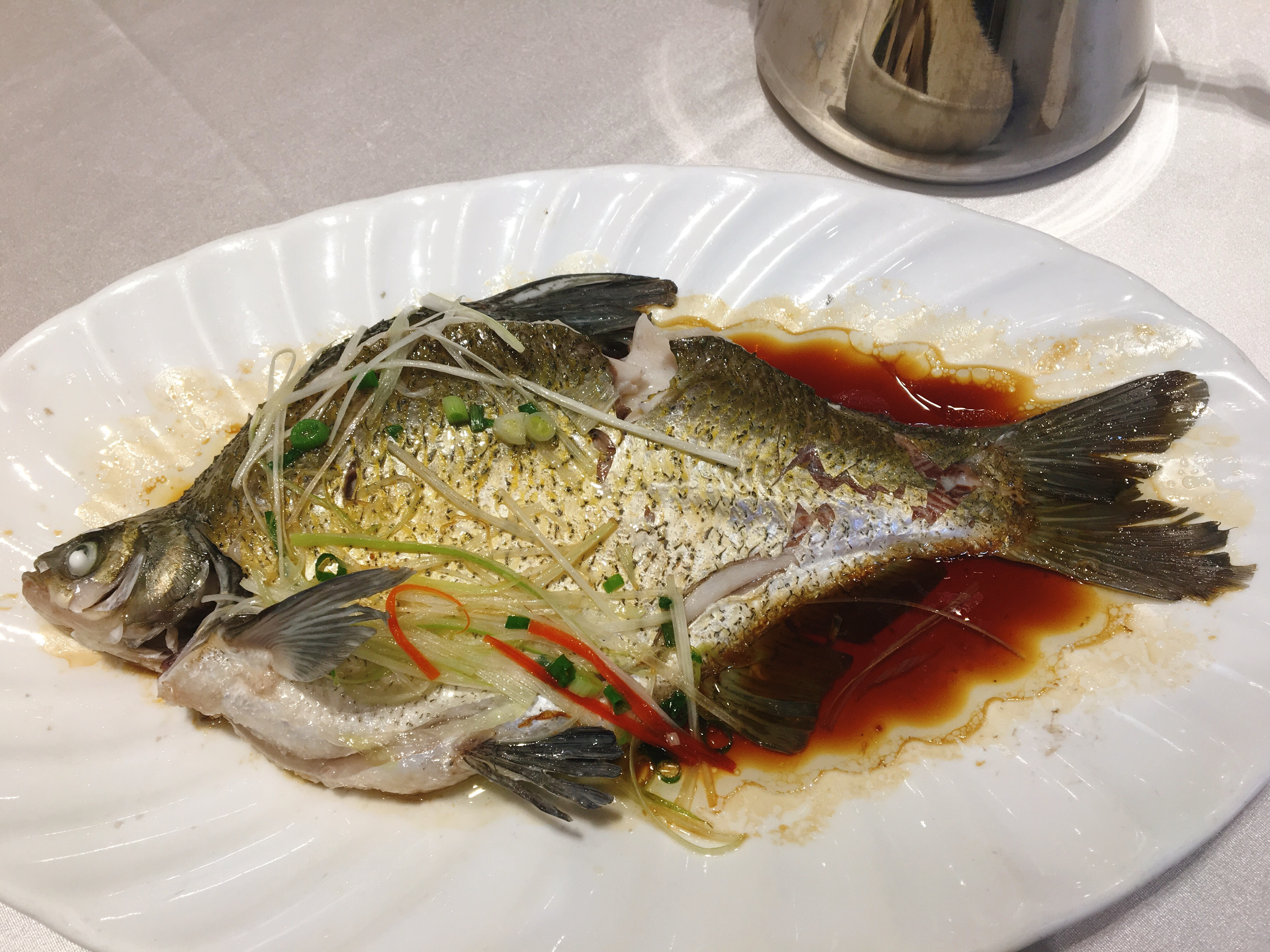
Steamed Wuchang bream

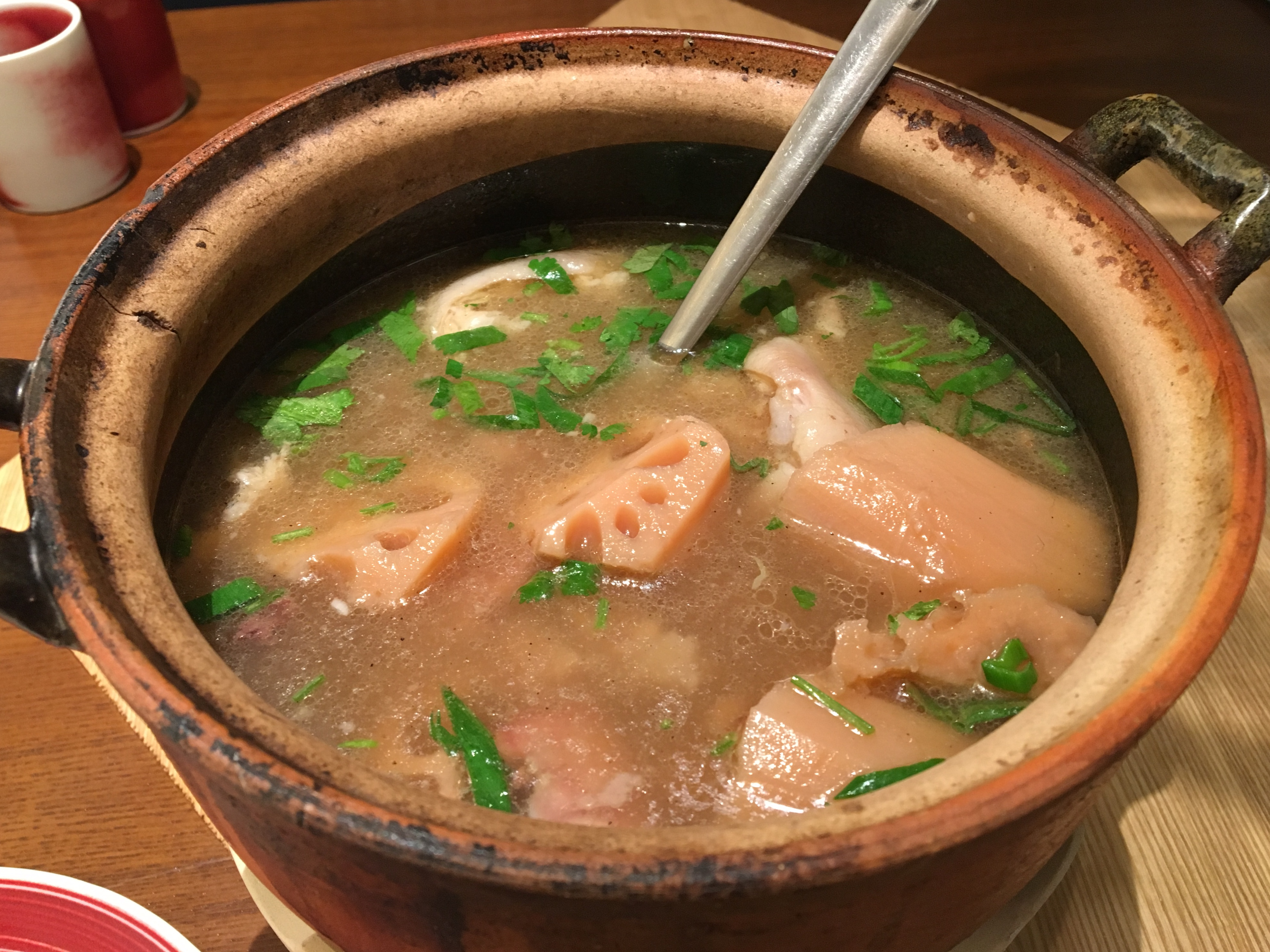
Lotus root soup with pork bones

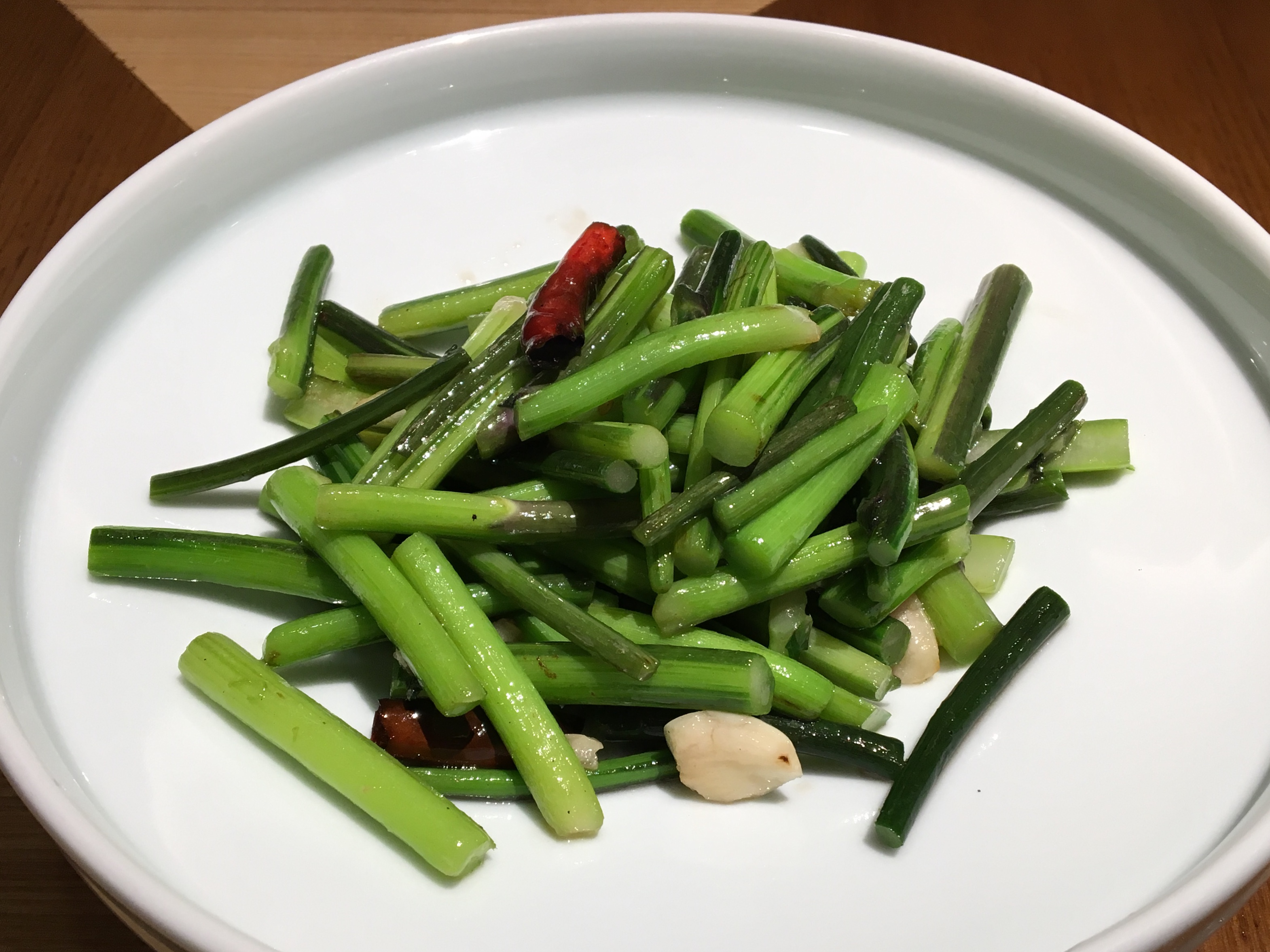
Fried Hongshan Caitai with garlic and chili

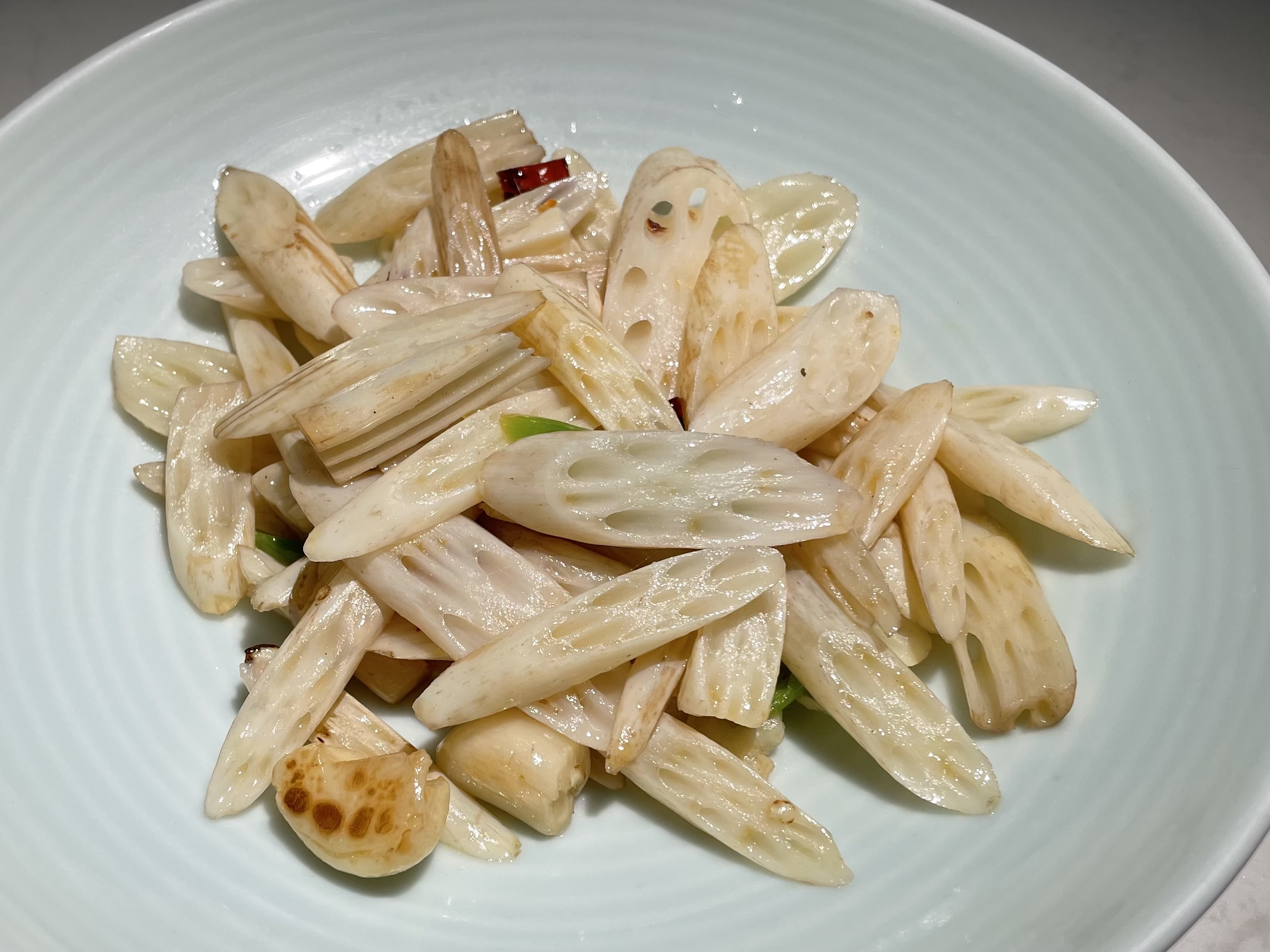
Fried Lotus Rootlet

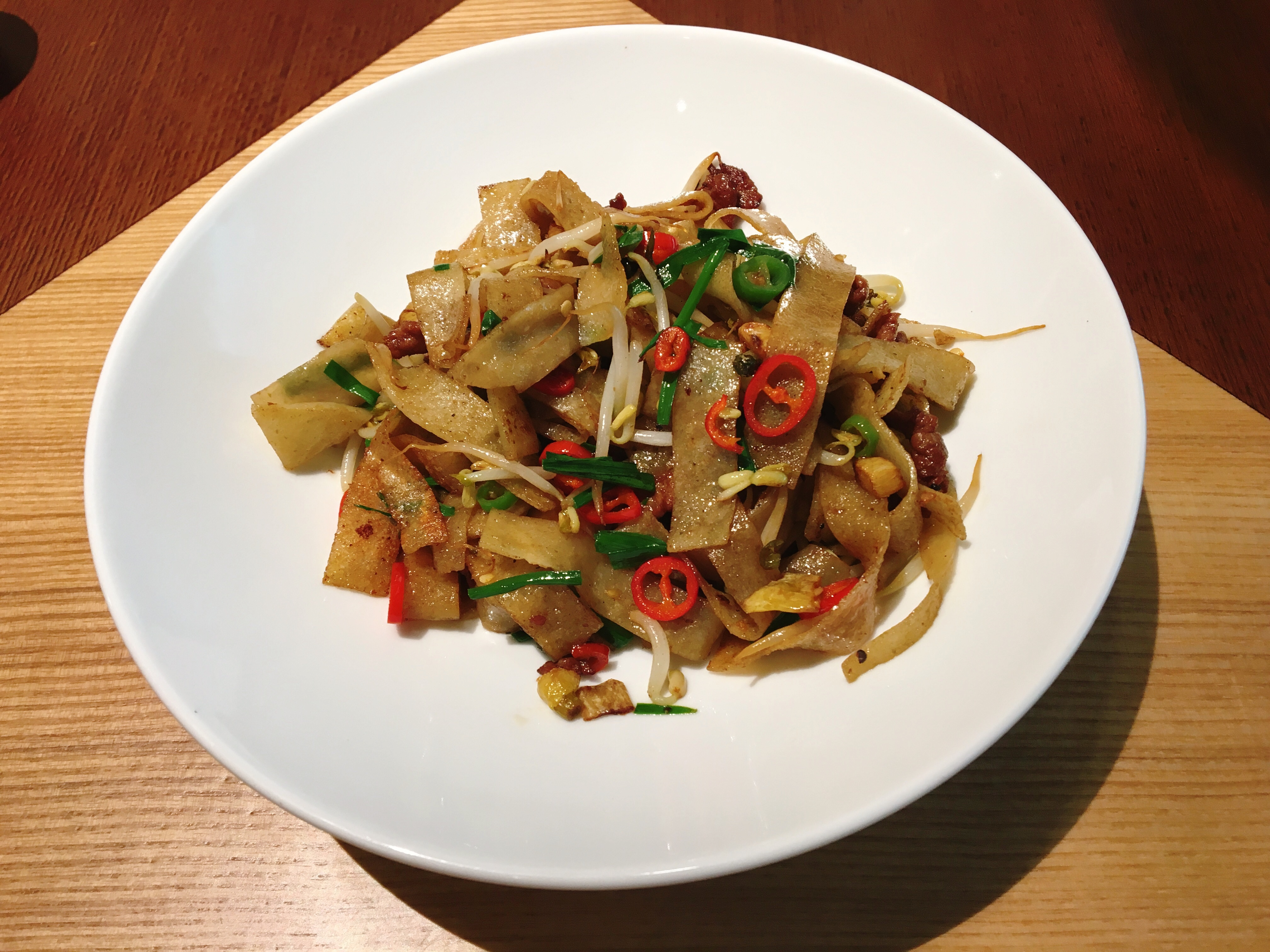
Fried Dousi with beef

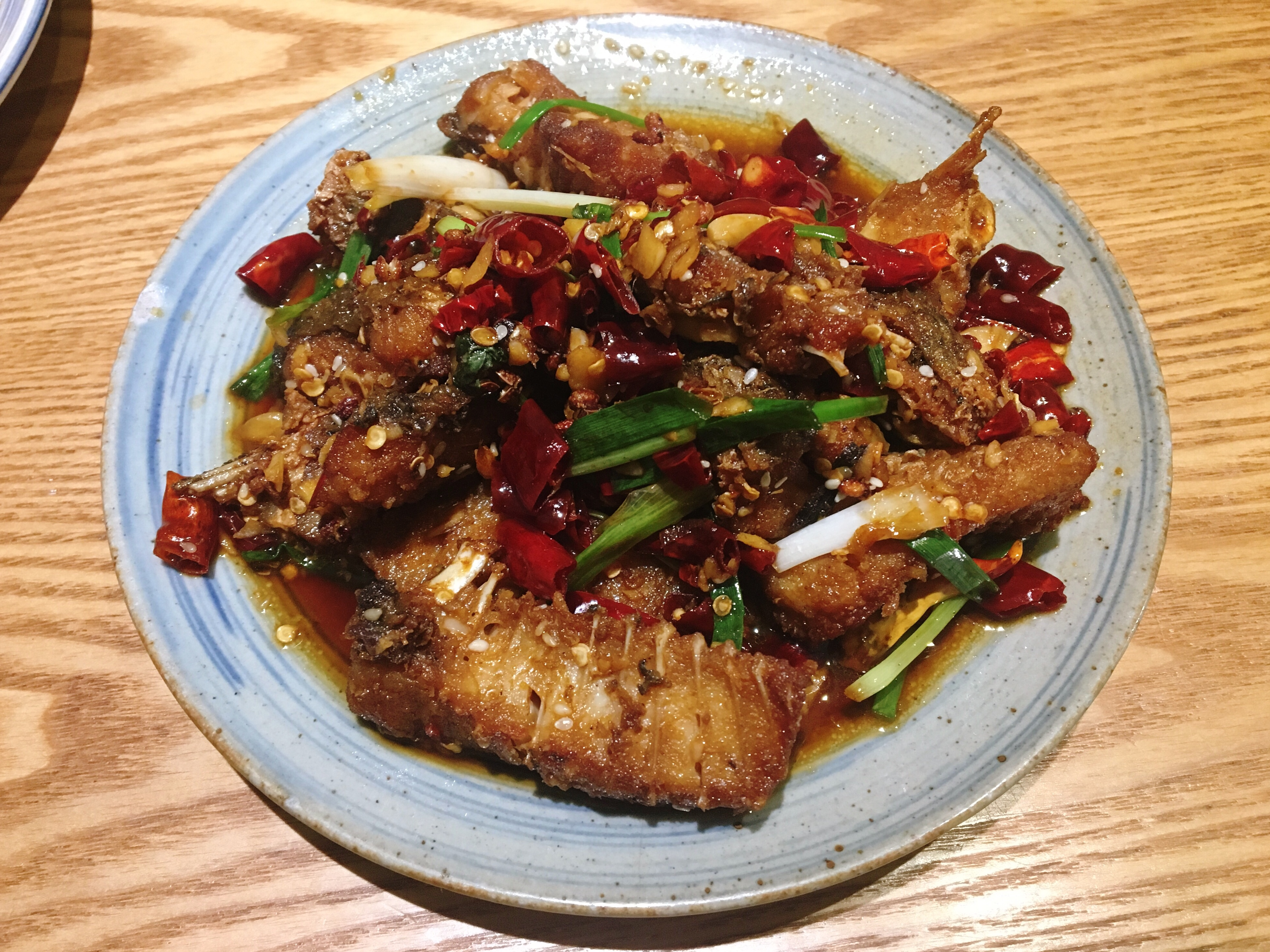
Cibayu, ciba-style grass carp

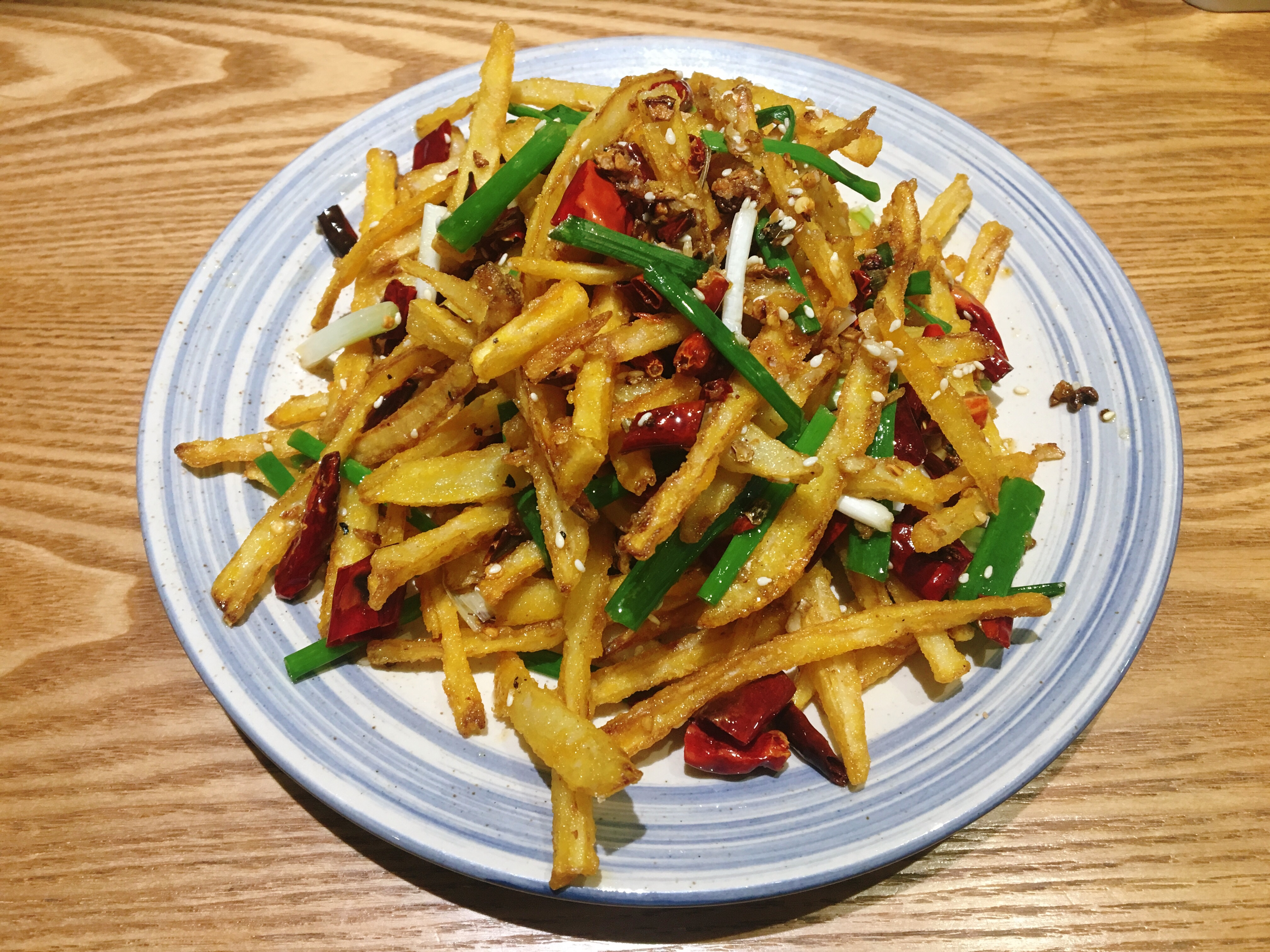
Ganbian Ousi, fried lotus root sticks

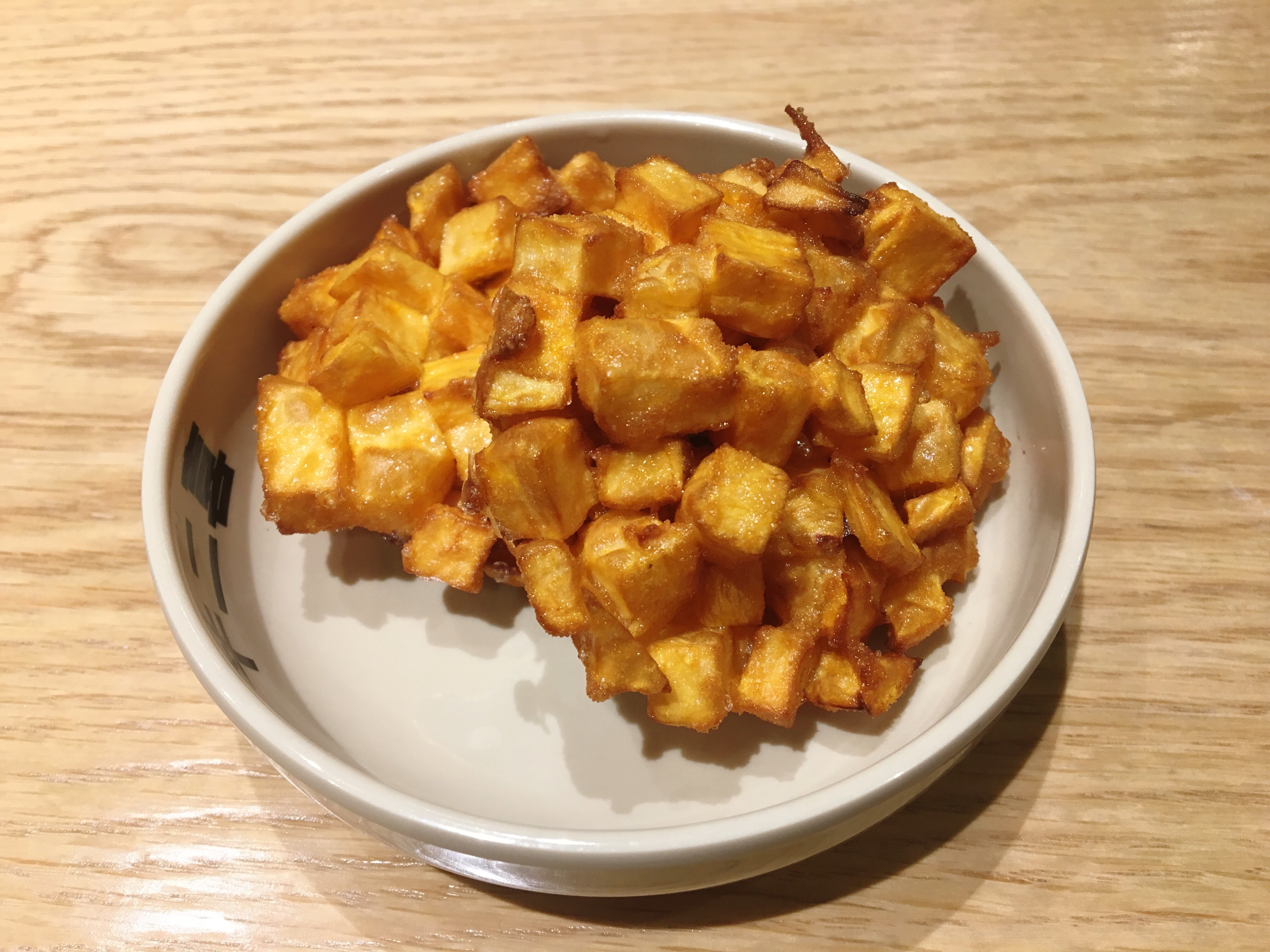
Shao Mianwo, deep-fried doughnut of sweet potato cubes

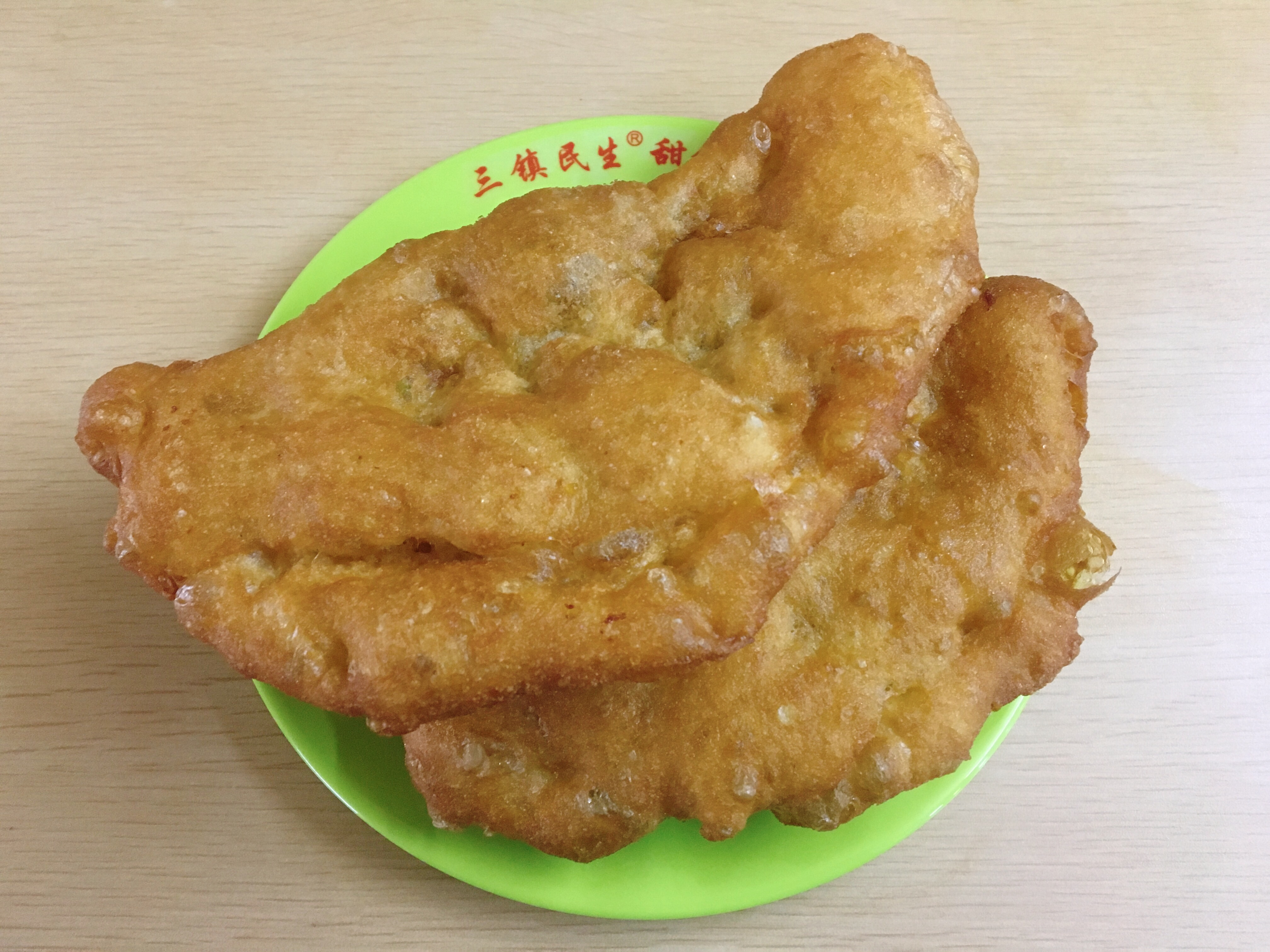
Jiguanjiao, fried jiguan dumpling (shaped like a chicken comb)

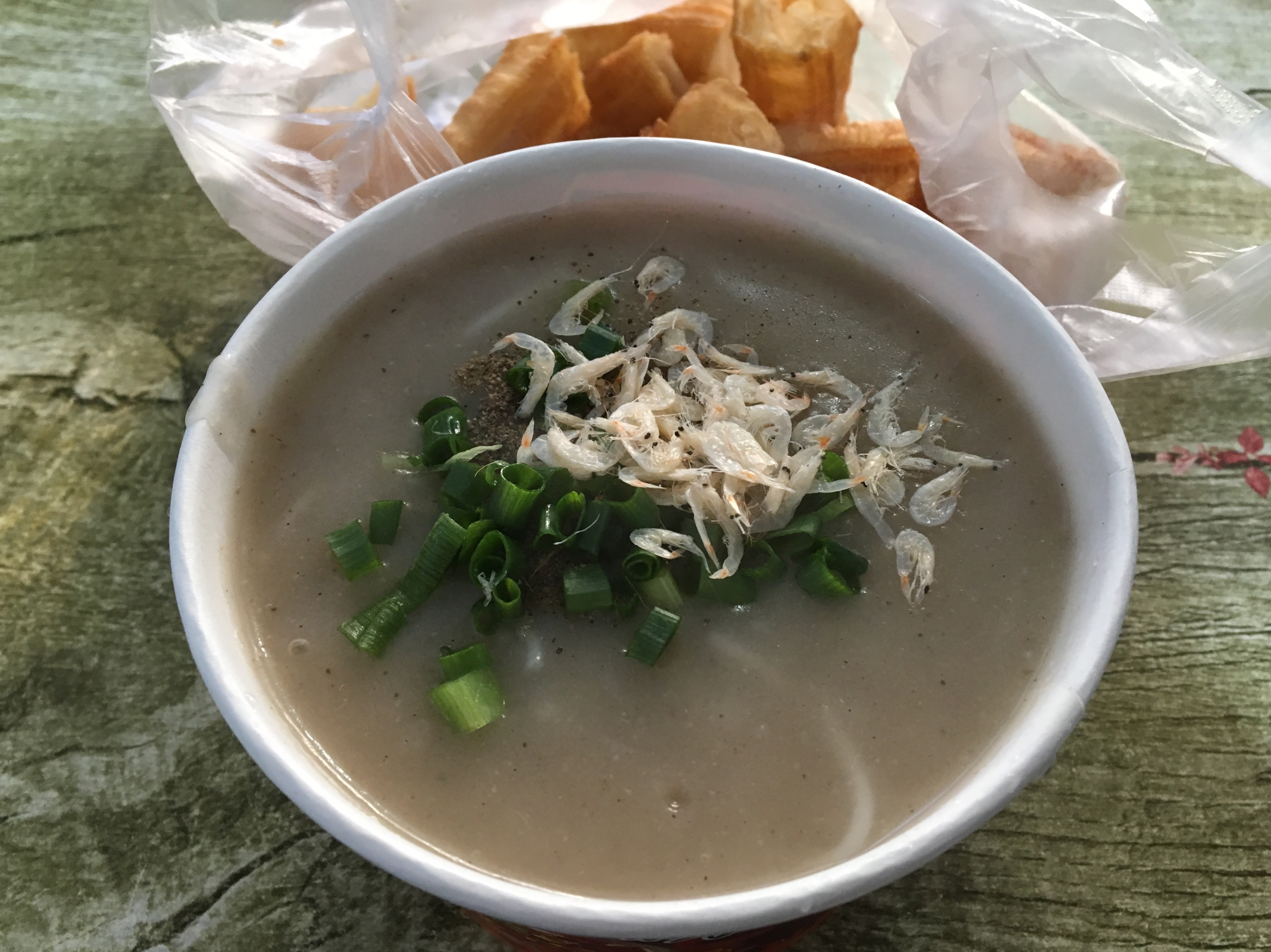
Hutangfen, rice noodles in peppery carp soup

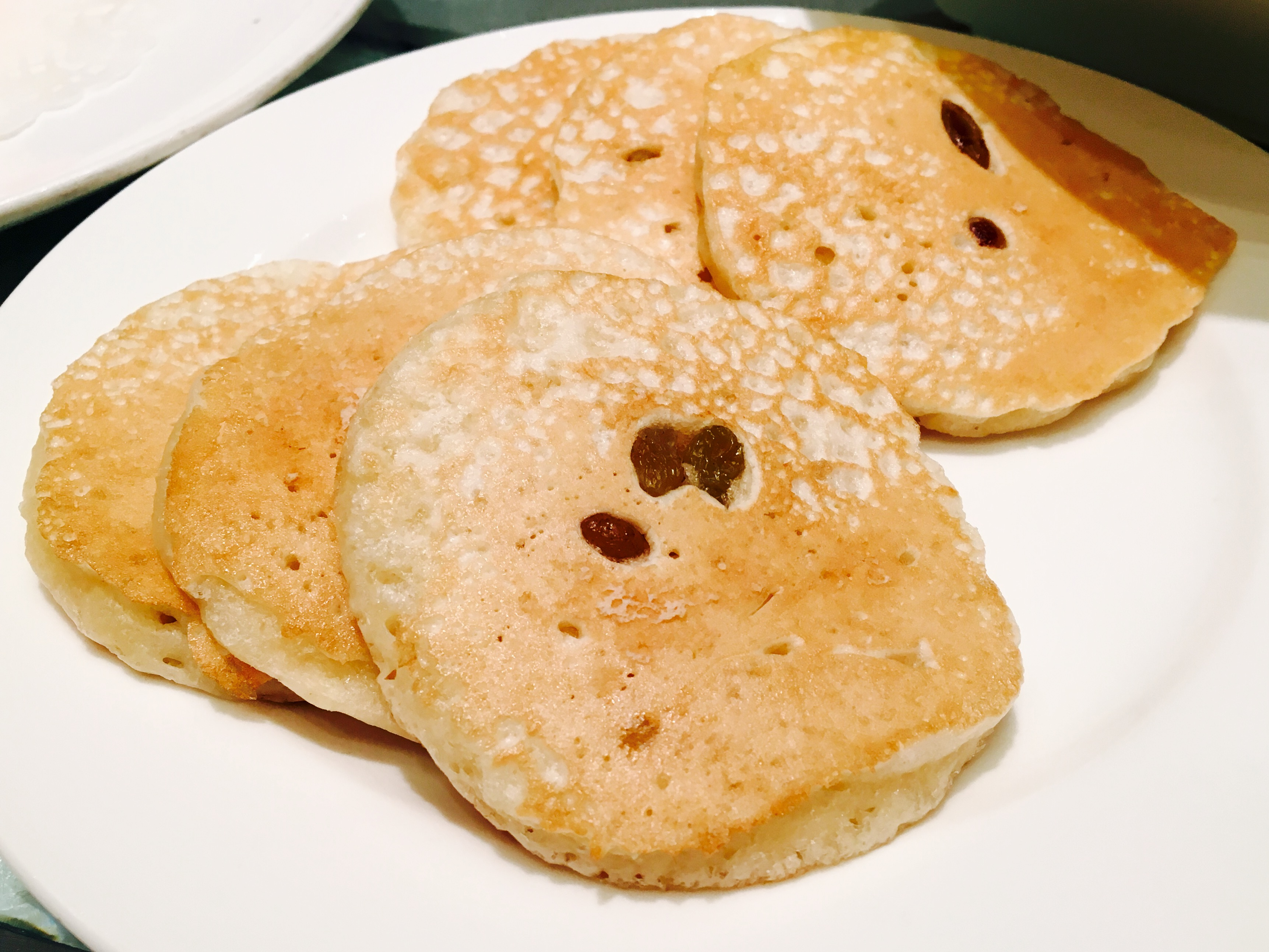
Miba, semisweet rice pancakes

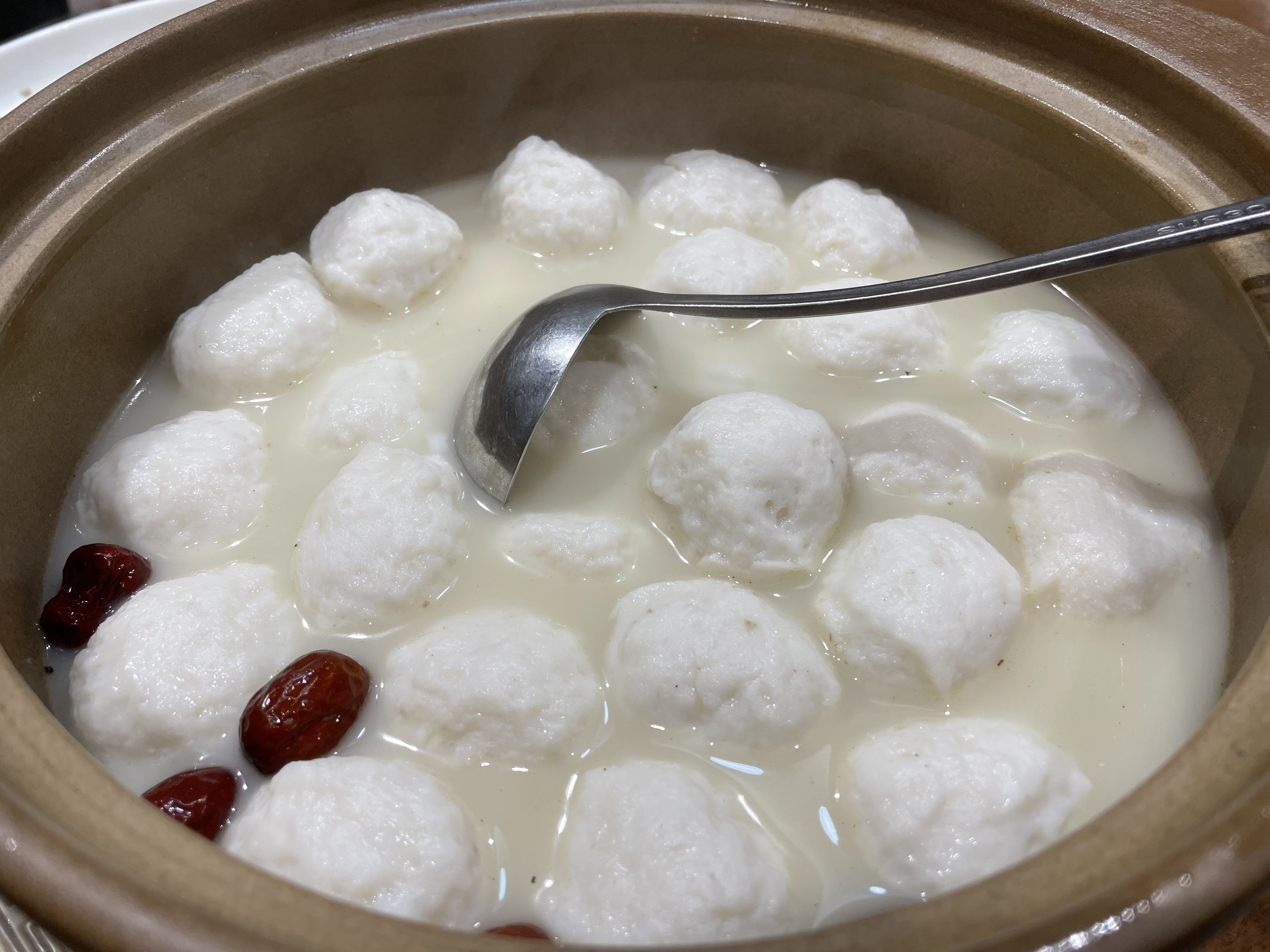
Yuyuan (fish balls in broth made from the same fish)

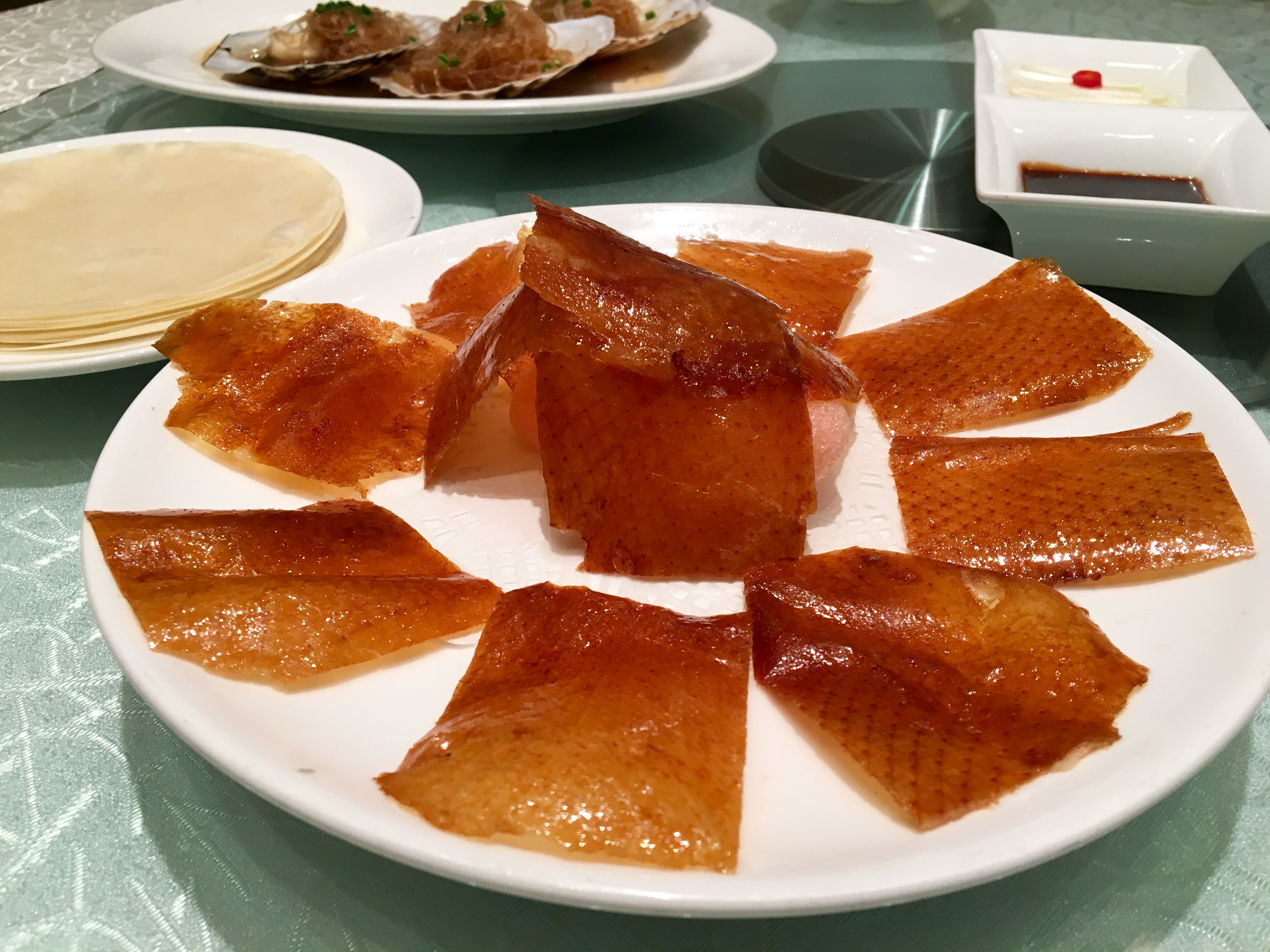
Pianpiya (crispy duck, sliced)

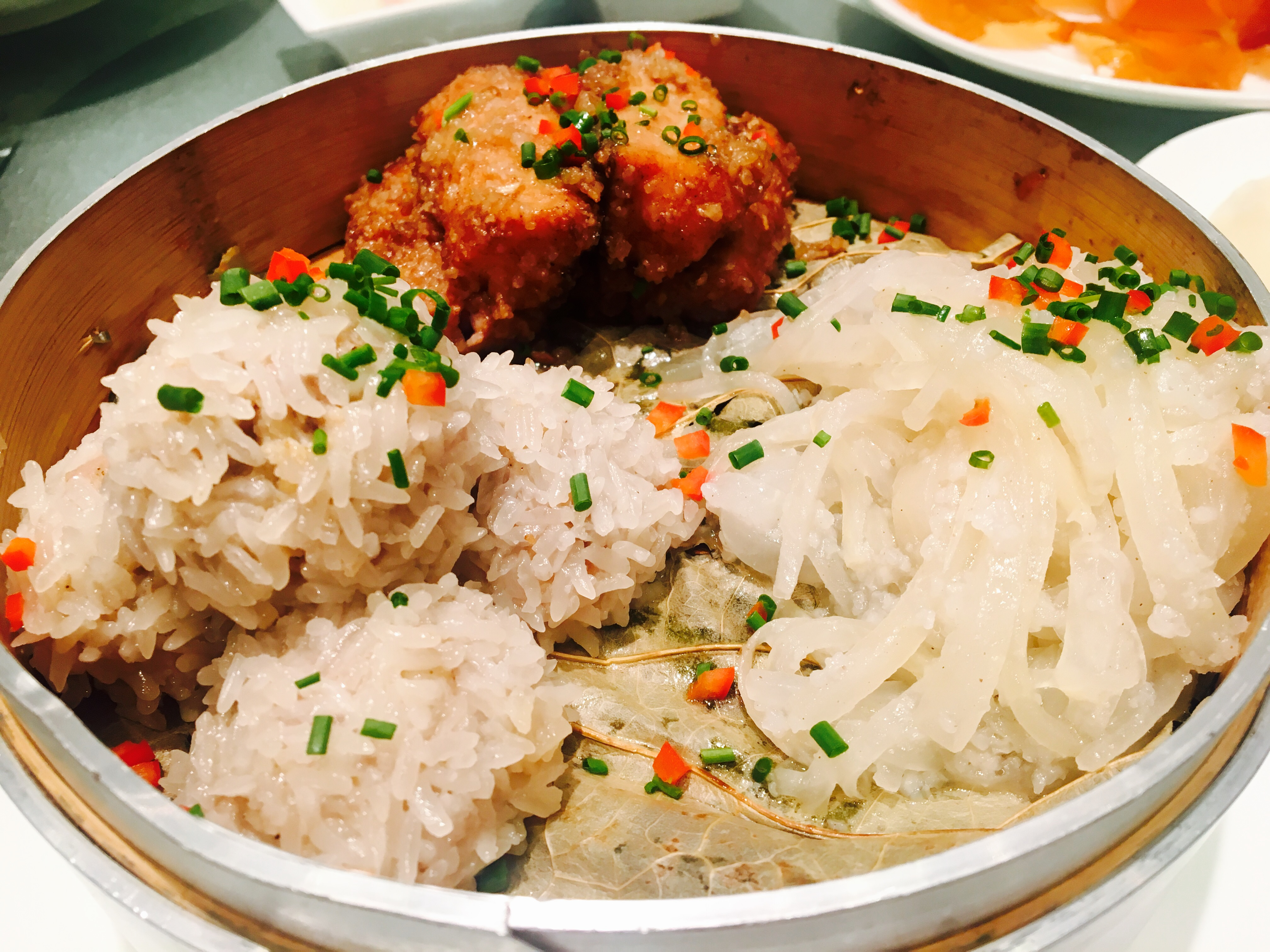
Mianyang Sanzheng (three steamed dishes of Mianyang)

== See also ==
- Hot dry noodles
- List of Chinese dishes
