= Hot dry noodles =

Noodle dish from Wuhan, China

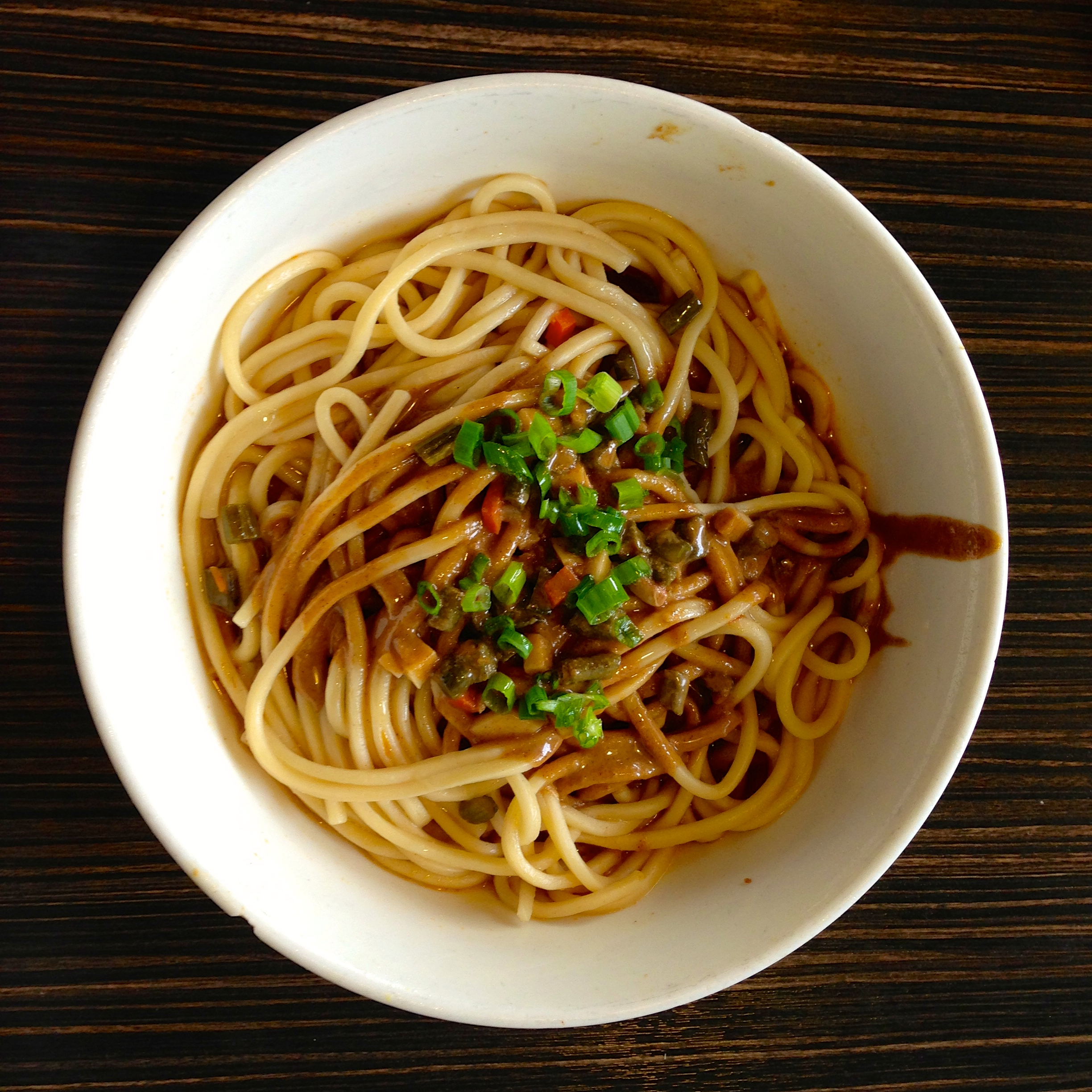
- Alternative names: 热干面
- Type: Noodles
- Course: Breakfast
- Place of origin: China
- Region or state: Wuhan
- Main ingredients: alkaline noodles, soy sauce, sesame paste, pickled carrots, garlic, chili oil

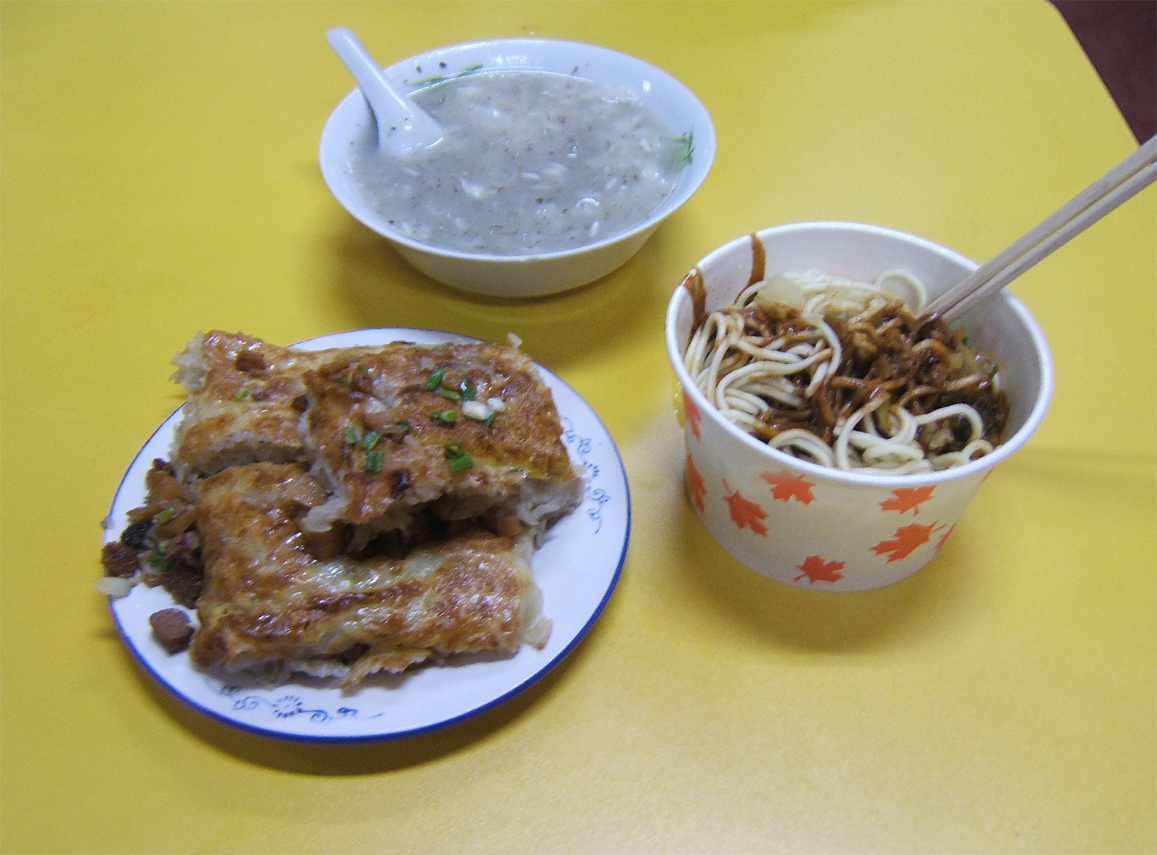
Hot dry noodles (right), doupi (left), and jiuniang (sweet rice wine).

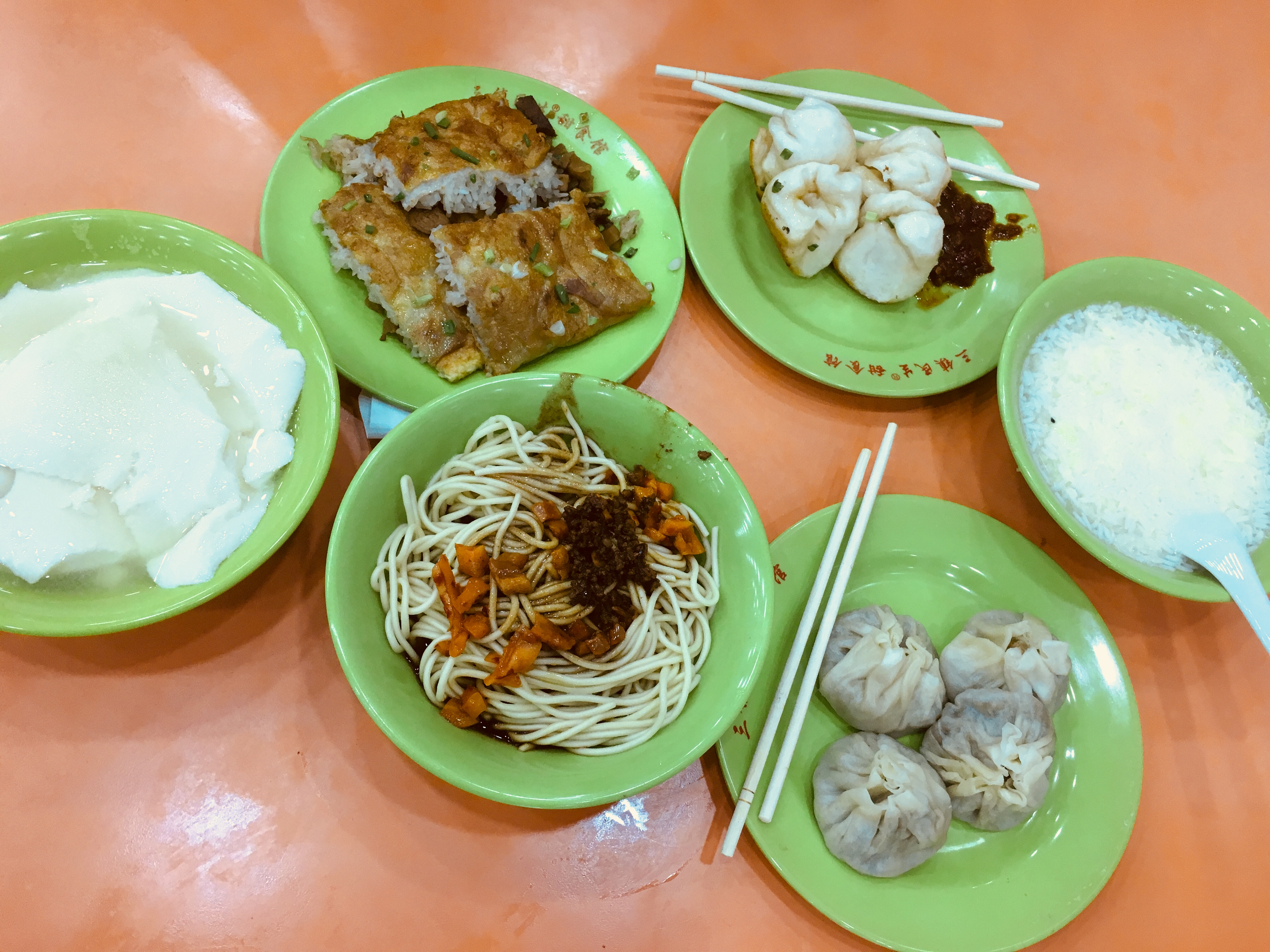
Wuhan breakfast

Hot dry noodles (simplified Chinese: 热干面; traditional Chinese: 熱乾麵; pinyin: règānmiàn), sometimes called reganmian after the Chinese name, are a traditional dish of Wuhan, the capital of Hubei province in central China. Hot dry noodles have an 80-year history in Chinese food culture; they are unique because the noodles are not in a broth like most other Asian-style hot noodle dishes. They are the most significant, famous and popular breakfast food in Wuhan, often sold by street carts and restaurants in residential and business areas. The price is between 4-6 yuan. In Wuhan, breakfast foods such as hot dry noodles are available starting from around 5 am. These noodles can be prepared within minutes and are affordable, making them a popular breakfast food. There are many restaurants for hot dry noodles within the city.

Typical hot dry noodle dishes contain soy sauce, sesame paste, pickled vegetables (carrots and beans), chopped garlic chives and chili oil. Hot dry noodles, Shanxi's knife-cut noodles, Lanzhou's lamian, Sichuan's dandan noodles, and Beijing's zhajiangmian have been described as the top five noodle dishes of China by the People's Daily. In a 2013 article, Business Insider reported that China Network Television rated hot dry noodles as the top Chinese noodle dish. The specifics of preparing hot dry noodles are discussed in Wuhan author Chi Li's novel Cold or Hot, It's Good to Live (冷也好热也好活着就好).

== Recipe ==
The recipe for hot dry noodles differs from that of cold noodles and soup noodles, as the dish is served hot without broth.

=== Noodles ===
To prepare the noodles, baking powder is mixed with water a day in advance to make alkali water. The alkali water, salt, and flour are combined in a ratio of 2:1:250. Dough is kneaded and rolled into noodles of 1.5-1.6mm in diameter.

A large pot of water is brought to a high heat, and the raw noodles are added before it boils. The noodles are stirred continuously to prevent clumping, and cold water is added intermittently after boiling while the pot is covered. Once the noodles turn transparent, they are removed and drained using a colander. The drained noodles are mixed with sesame oil to prevent sticking, then spread out on a surface to cool down.

Before serving, the noodles are placed in a cone-shaped strainer, dipped briefly into boiling water, swirled, and drained.

=== Sauce ===
Once the noodles are reheated, they are transferred to a bowl and drizzled with a prepared sauce mixture. The sauce typically includes sesame paste, soy sauce, pickled radish, and other seasonings such as Chinese chives, chili oil, vinegar, MSG, pepper, according to taste. Other possible ingredients include sesame oil, chopped scallions, pickled vegetables, or mustard greens.

=== Final steps ===
Once seasoned, the noodles are thoroughly stirred to evenly coat them with sauce. They are served immediately while hot.

== Origin ==
Summer in Wuhan is long, and high temperatures cause food to spoil rapidly. Consequently, people would add baking soda to noodles to slow down the process of food spoilage. This eventually led to the creation of hot dry noodles.

There are multiple origin stories for the invention of hot dry noodles:

=== Bao Li ===
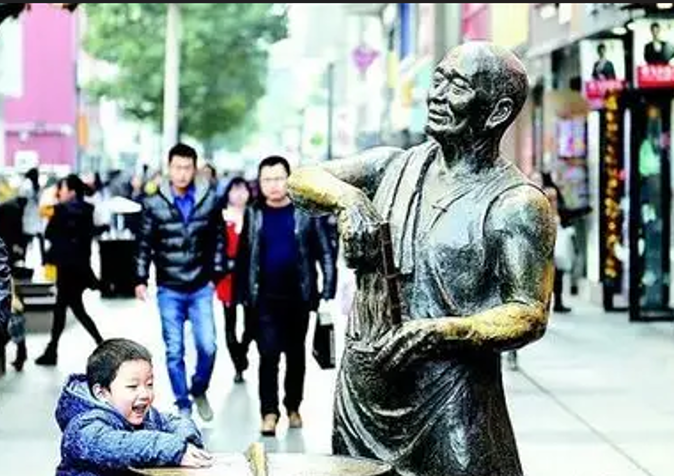
The Statue of Bao Li

According to a widely circulated version of the origin story, in the 1930s, there was a small food stand on Changdi Street operated by Bao Li, a hawker who made a living by selling bean noodles and noodle soup in the Guandi temple area in Hankou. Due to the hot weather, business was bad and many of his noodles went unsold. There were no refrigerators at the time, so unsold noodles would spoil and become inedible. Li poured sesame oil onto his noodles accidentally; he boiled them and added shallot and other condiments, and sold them the next morning. His noodles became popular because of their unique taste, and Bao Li began to call them "hot dry noodles".

From then on, Bao Li specialized in hot dry noodles, which caused a sensation in Wuhan. Many cooks learned the dish from him. However, Bao Li's version of hot dry noodles is different from the modern recipe.

=== Cai Mingwei ===
Cai Mingwei was born in April 1912 in Caijiazha Street, Huangpi District. He worked in a pharmacy in Hankou for 6 years, and began to sell noodles after leaving the pharmacy. His recipe involved boiling traditional oil noodles, taking them out, pouring sesame oil on them, and mixing them together. Many people in Hankou made a living from this, especially those from Huangpi. Cai Mingwei chose to sell to students at the school gate. To make noodles quickly in the morning, he cooked the noodles in advance, poured water to cool them down, added oil to mix them, spread them out to cool and dry them, and rolled them into bundles for use. When his noodles were purchased, they only had to be boiled and seasonings added to be eaten, which increased serving speed and efficiency. Later, in order to increase the toughness of his machine-made noodles, Cai borrowed from the oil noodle recipe and gradually added salt and edible alkali. He began to sprinkle sesame oil, balsamic vinegar and other homemade special seasonings on his noodles to form sesame paste noodles. Later, Cai began to cut the carrots from his hometown in Huangpi into strips, marinating them with salt, soy sauce, five-spice powder, and other seasonings, and drying them slightly after draining them. Finally, he added pure sesame paste, pepper powder, and granulated sugar, and created the hot dry noodles that are eaten now by people in Wuhan.

Hot dry noodles were officially named in 1950. In 1945, after China's victory in the Second Sino-Japanese War, Cai Mingwei opened a famous restaurant for hot dry noodles, Cai Lin Ji, at the corner of Manchun Road, Zhongshan Avenue. According to legend, the name of Cai Lin Ji came from two tall chinaberry trees in front of the business. It is traditionally said that the two trees symbolized hard work and happiness, and since Cai Mingwei had two sons, they also symbolized that good things come in pairs, and naming the store Cai Lin Ji would bring good luck.

== Cultural significance ==
Hot dry noodles are considered to be a symbol of Wuhan's culture.

=== Geographical environment and climate ===
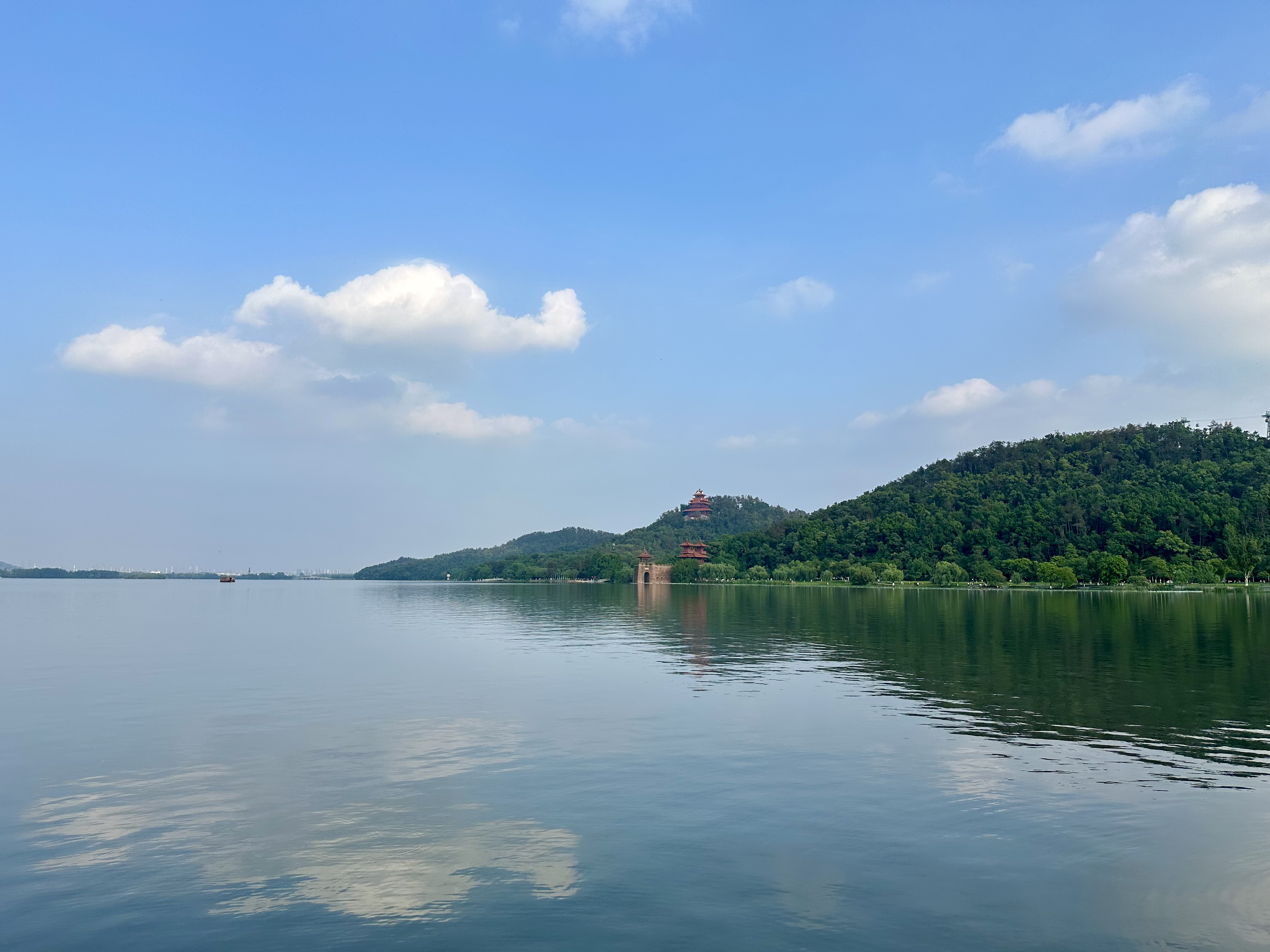
Mount Mo and East Lake, Wuhan

Wuhan has a subtropical monsoon climate in the central part of the city, with abundant rainfall and sunshine. There are many bodies of water, and the entire city is divided into three parts by the Yangtze River and the Han River. There are numerous lakes, including the East Lake, and largely flat terrain. Under these climatic conditions, it is difficult for local heat to dissipate in the summer, resulting in hot and humid weather. Food spoils easily in these circumstances. However, the noodles in reganmian are processed with alkaline water, water that has been mixed with baking soda, ensuring they have low water content and are more durable than ordinary noodles. The ingredients of the sauce are also easily stored and rarely spoil. This allows hot dry noodles to be prepared by families and restaurants at any time. In the winter, due to the lack of geographic barriers, the city is easily affected by cold air from the north, causing low temperatures and high humidity. But the noodles are dry, durable, and not affected by ambient moisture, which is absorbed by the alkaline water.

=== Humanities ===
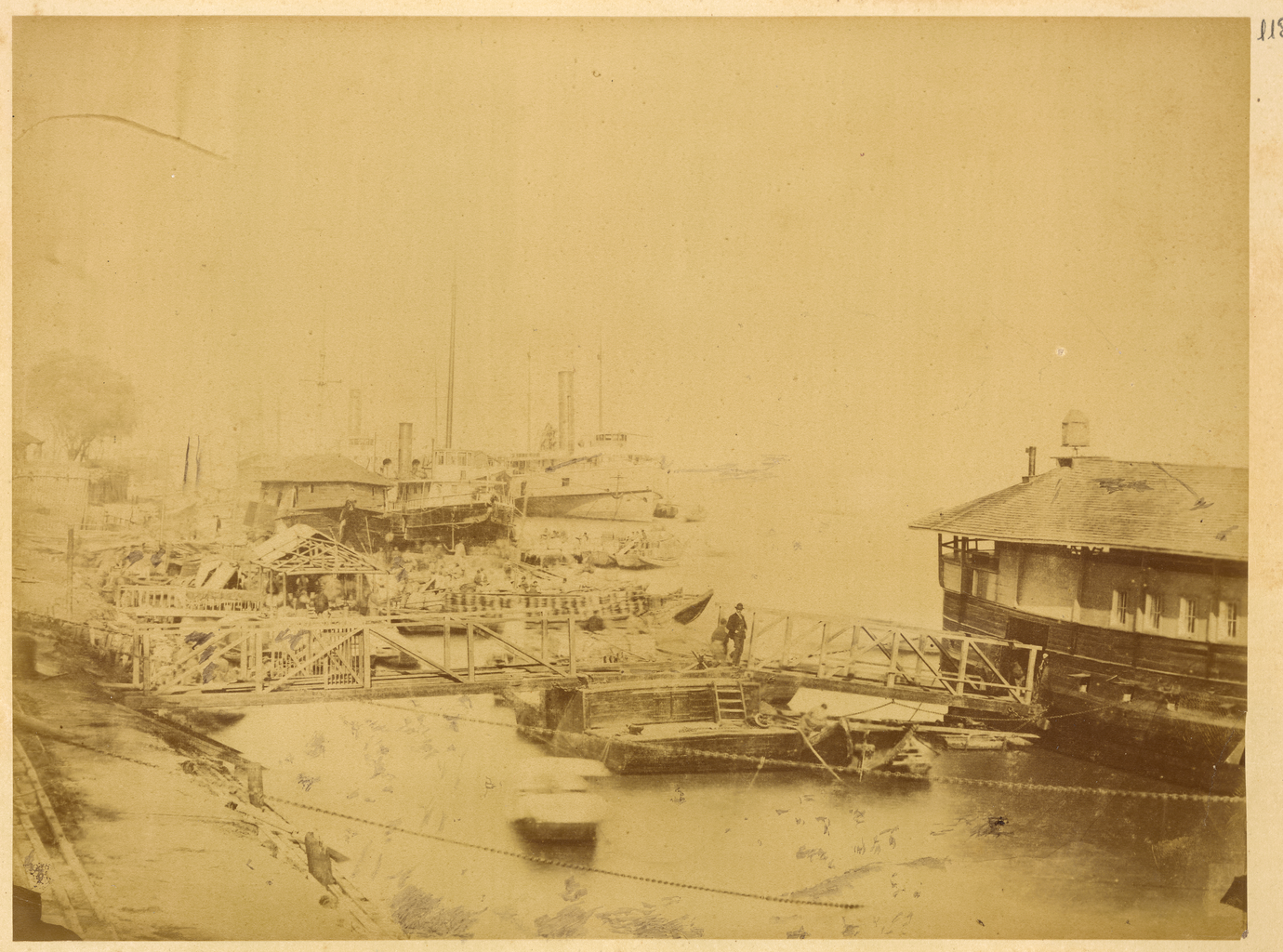
Pier in Wuhan

Eating breakfast in Wuhan is commonly known as "guòzǎo" (simplified Chinese: 过早; traditional Chinese: 過早; pinyin: guòzǎo), indicating the importance of breakfast to Wuhan's culture. In the 20th century, ships often passed by the docks in Wuhan, and boatmen, dock workers, and merchants from all over the country would gather in the city. The crowded circumstances led to a demand for fast and simple food, and hot dry noodles became a popular choice. Today, people in Wuhan often rise early for work or morning exercises, and hot dry noodles are still a popular breakfast food.

== Variety ==
During the development and spread of the recipe for hot dry noodles, people in Xinyang, a city in Henan Province, developed their own preparation method, which eventually became a variant of hot dry noodles.

There are several differences between the hot dry noodles of Wuhan and Xinyang. Xinyang's hot dry noodles generally use a larger bowl. In Wuhan, the noodles are usually cooked in water first, with sauce added later, but Xinyang uses beef and minced beef, with a meat soup added later. Xinyang's noodles have a more mellow flavor. In terms of seasoning, Wuhan's hot dry noodles have more peanuts in their sesame sauce, while Xinyang uses purer sesame sauce without additional seasoning.

== See also ==
- Chinese noodles
- Singapore noodles
- Dandan noodles
