= Doupi =

Breakfast dish from Wuhan, China

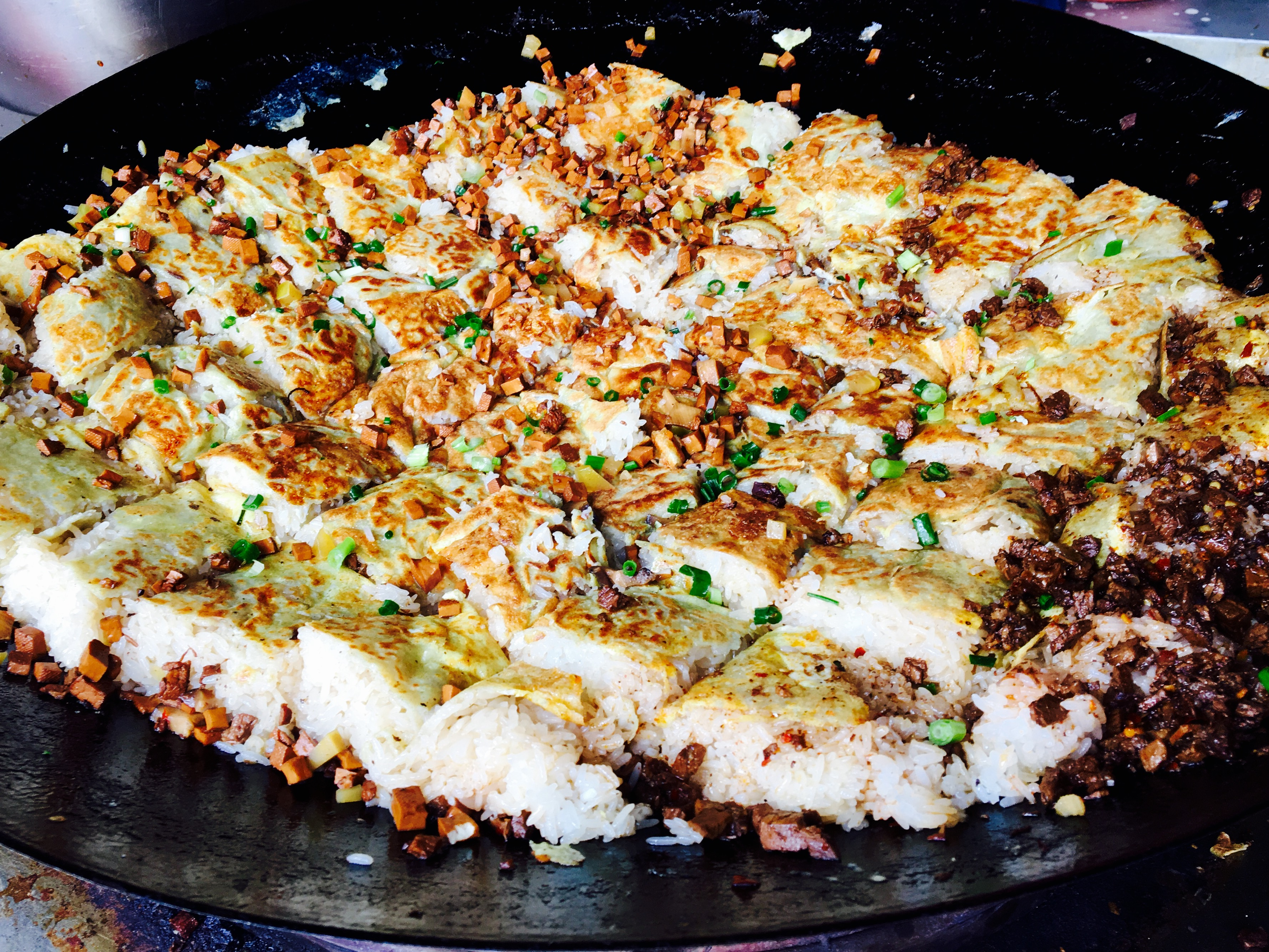
Freshly made doupi in Wuhan

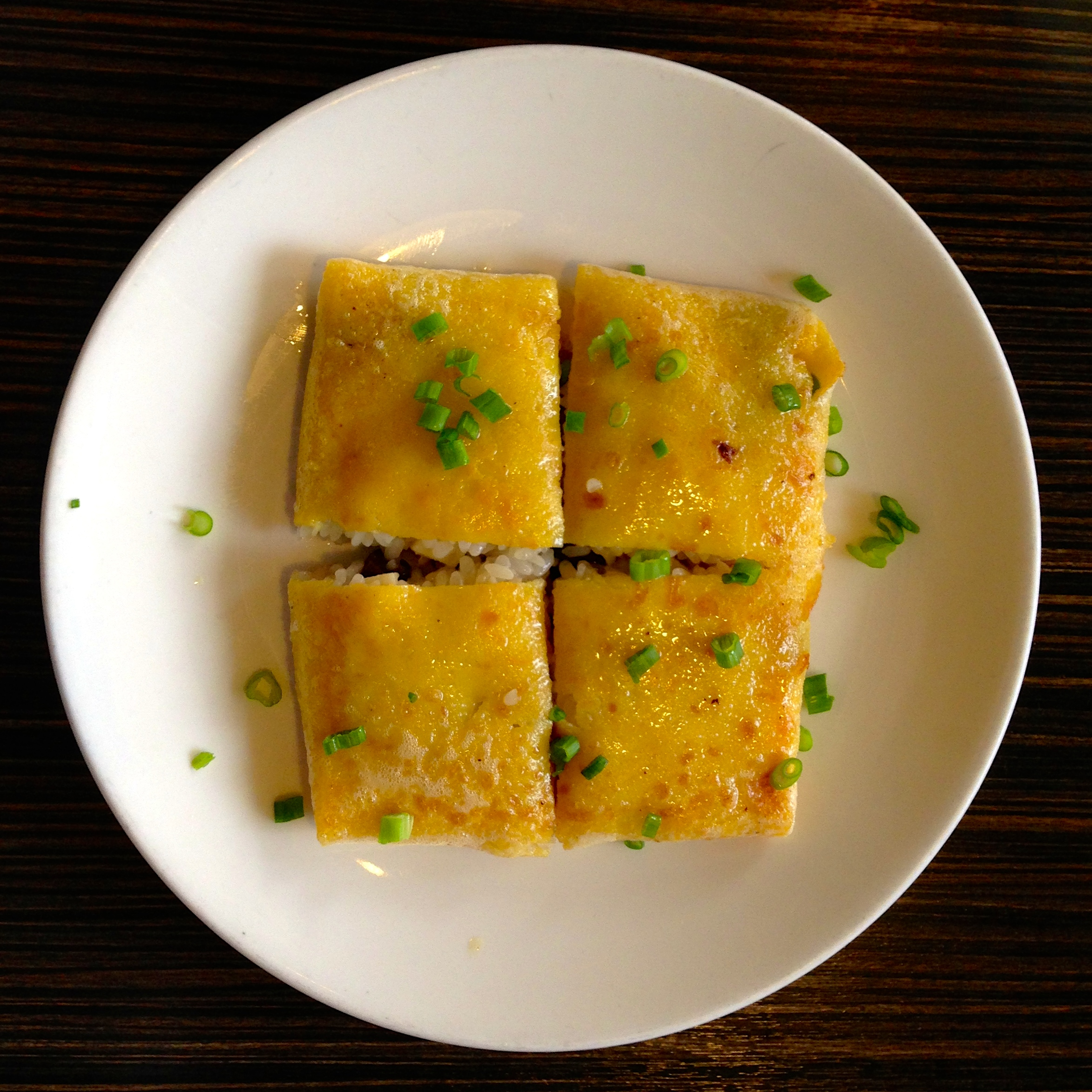
A portion of doupi on a plate

Doupi (Chinese: 豆皮; pinyin: dὸupί), also called "triple delicacy doupi" (三鲜豆皮, sānxiān dòupí), is a breakfast dish from the city of Wuhan in Hubei province. It is often sold as a street food.

== Origin ==
The name of the food comes from the material of the outside layer, which is made out of a blend of green bean powder, eggs, milk, and flour.

This dish was invented in 1931 by a local chef who improved the traditional doupi cooking style and later went on to open the famous restaurant named Laotongcheng.

At the beginning, people made doupi as holiday meals at every festival. They mixed mung beans with rice and ground it into a paste. Then they spread the paste into a thin pancake named "bean skin" and used it to wrap sticky rice and diced meat. Finally, they fried it. Many years later, doupi became a common breakfast food.

== Variety ==
Doupi is filled with fresh meat, eggs and shrimp. In addition, there is an alternative preparation where doupi is filled with fresh meat, fresh mushroom and fresh bamboo shoots. The filling is prepared ahead of time, with ingredients cut into small pieces and cooked in a pot with several seasonings.

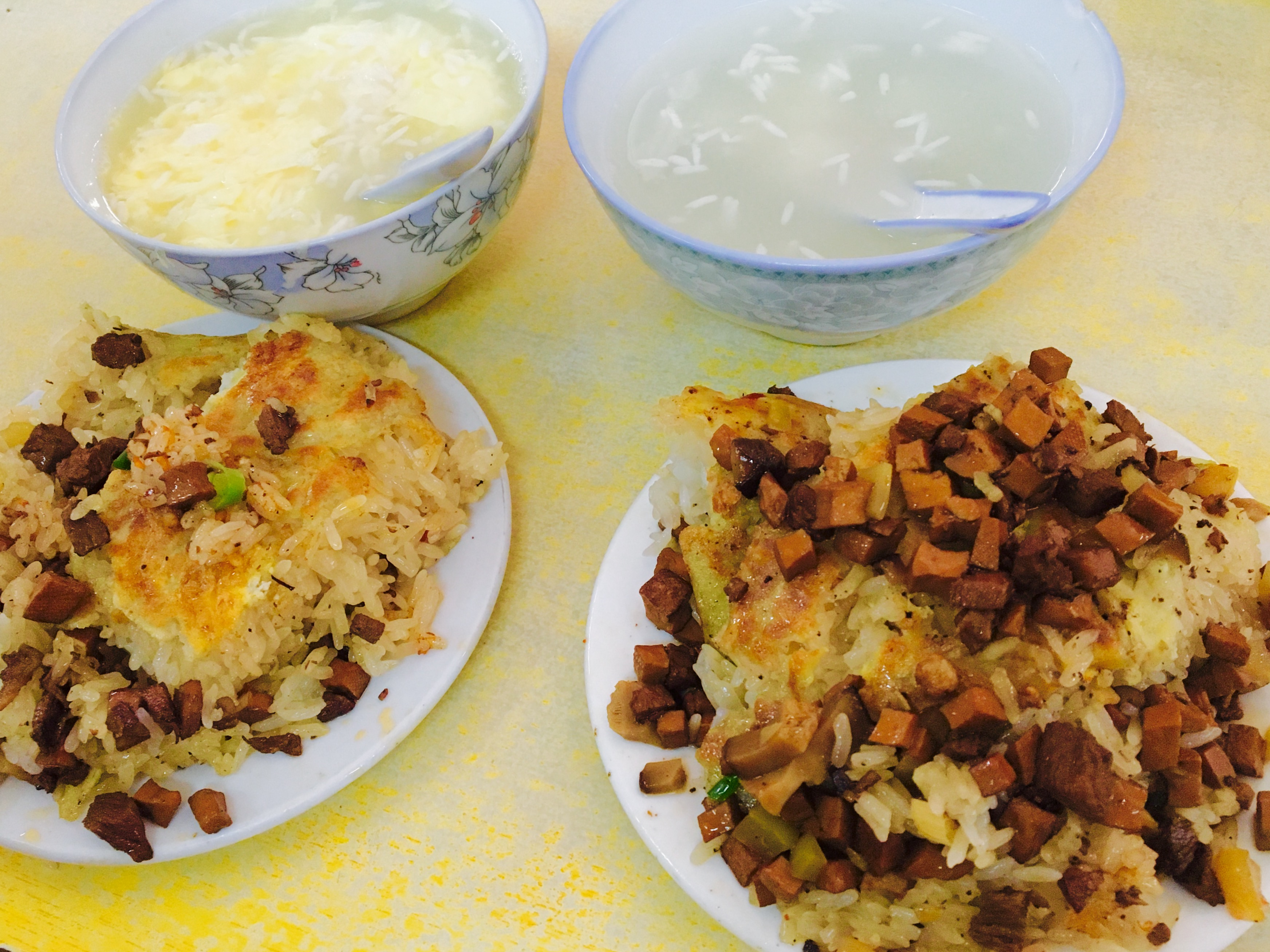
Doupi as breakfast served with Mijiu

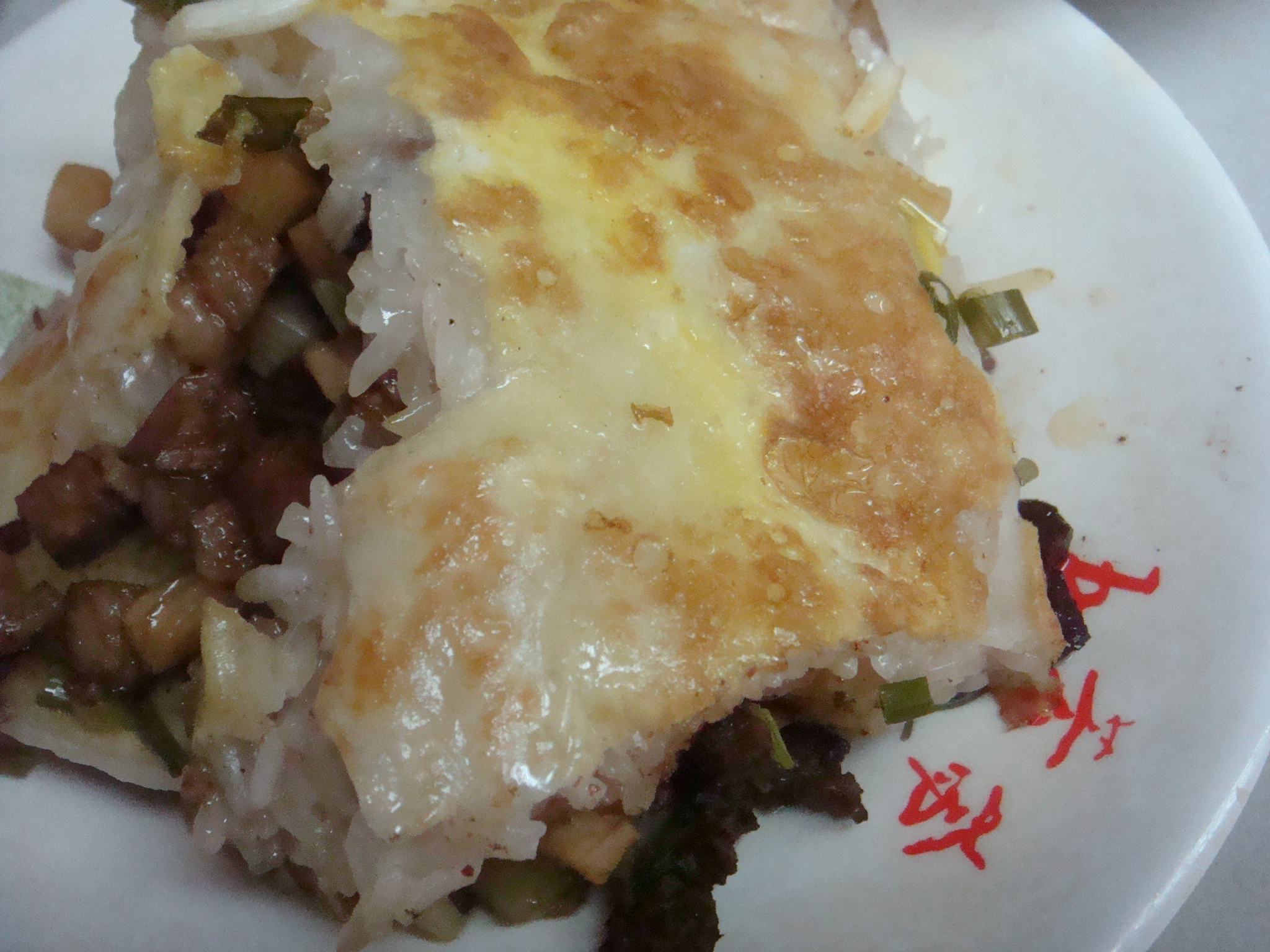
Doupi of Wufangzhai (Chinese: 五芳齋)

== See also ==
- Hubei cuisine
