= Pizza Hut =

American multinational restaurant chain

Pizza Hut, LLC
- Logo used since July 2025
- Trade name: Pizza Hut
- Formerly: Pizza Hut, Inc.
- Type: Subsidiary
- Industry: Restaurant
- Genre: Pizzeria; Fast food
- Founded: May 31, 1958; 68 years ago Wichita, Kansas, U.S.
- Founders: Dan Carney; Frank Carney
- Headquarters: 7100 Corporate Dr., Plano, Texas, U.S.
- Number of locations: 19,974 restaurants worldwide (2025)
- Area served: Worldwide
- Key people: Aaron Powell (president, Pizza Hut International)
- Products: Pizza; pan pizza; pasta; chicken wings; breadsticks
- Services: Franchising
- Revenue: ▲US$1.091 billion (2016)
- Number of employees: About 350,000
- Parent: LongRange Capital (worldwide, except China); Yum China (China only)
- Website: pizzahut.com

Pizza Hut, LLC is an American multinational pizza restaurant chain and international franchise founded in 1958 in Wichita, Kansas, by brothers Dan and Frank Carney. The chain, headquartered in Plano, Texas, (Note: The headquarters was moved to the location of the KFC headquarters as both companies were owned by Yum! Brands in 2025.) operates 19,974 restaurants worldwide as of 2025.

While studying at Wichita State University, the Carneys opened their first location, which quickly expanded to six outlets within a year. The brand began franchising in 1959, and its distinctive building style was designed by Chicagoan architect George Lindstrom in 1963. Pizza Hut experienced significant growth, including the acquisition by PepsiCo in 1977, followed by a spin-off into Tricon Global Restaurants, Inc., later renamed Yum! Brands in 2002, who are the former owners, and later, the acquisition by LongRange Capital and Yum China in 2026.

== History ==
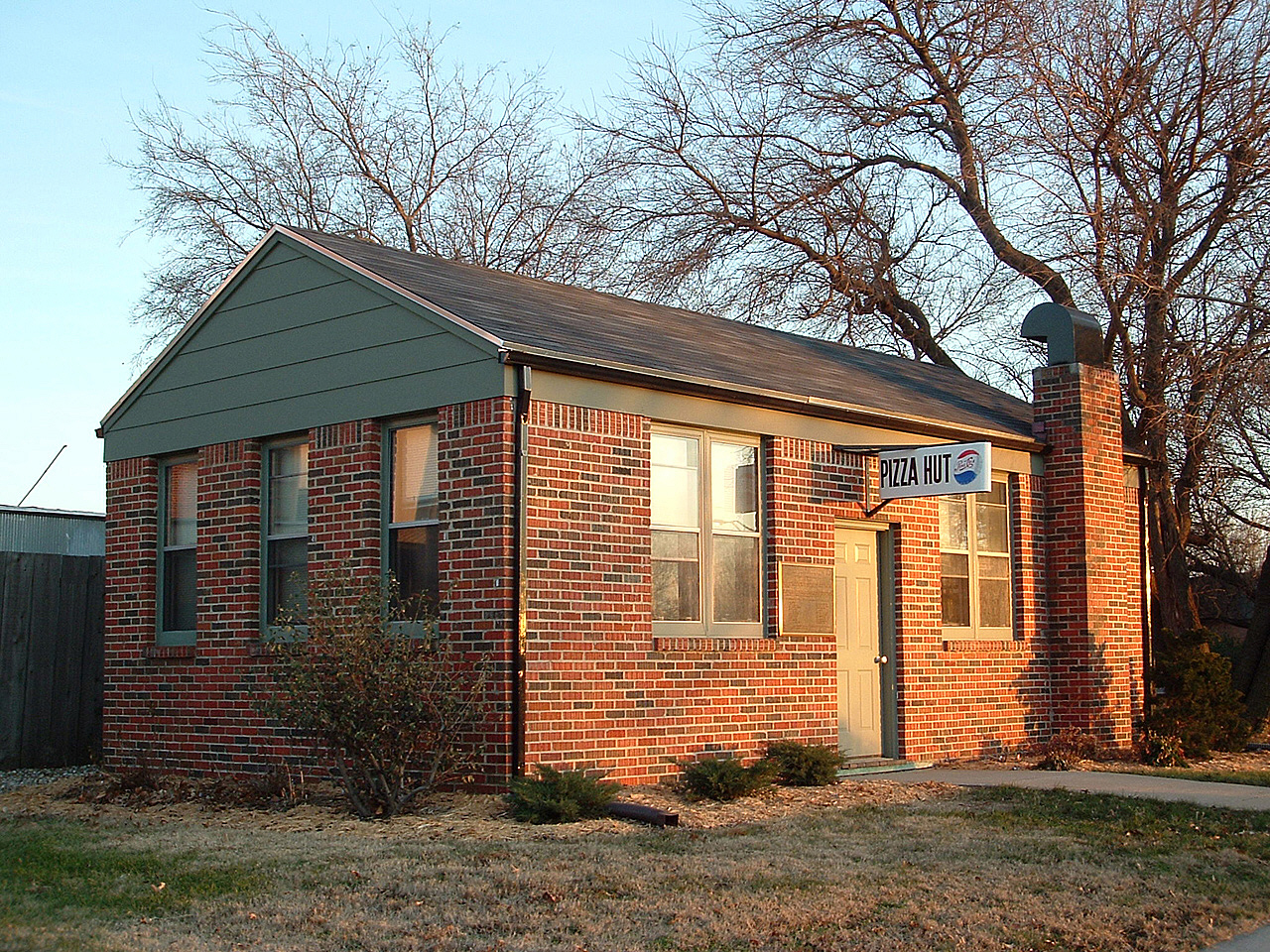
The first Pizza Hut opened on May 31, 1958, in Wichita, Kansas.

Pizza Hut was launched on May 31, 1958, by two brothers, Dan and Frank Carney, both Wichita State students, as a single location in Wichita, Kansas. They were given a $600 loan from their mother to start the business. The brothers used the name Pizza Hut because the sign could only hold eight letters. Six months later they opened a second outlet, and within a year they were operating six locations. The brothers began franchising in 1959 with a location in Topeka, Kansas. By 1963, there were 24 locations.

One early employee was future Pro Football Hall of Fame head coach Bill Parcells, who had worked for the company while a college student and football player at Wichita State University. Parcells was considering a franchise for a career (as well as law school), but instead chose to enter coaching, eventually becoming a head coach in the National Football League.

By 1966, the company had 140 locations and had established its headquarters in Wichita. The first Pizza Hut restaurant east of the Mississippi River was opened in Athens, Ohio, in 1966 by Lawrence Berberick and Gary Meyers. The iconic Pizza Hut building style with the distinctive red roof was introduced in 1969, and was later incorporated into the corporate logo. By the end of the decade, there were over 300 locations. The Carneys took the company public in 1969.

By 1971, Pizza Hut had more locations and higher sales than any of its competitors. In the early 1970s, Pizza Hut opened several other chains to diversify its menu. These included the fast-food Mexican eatery Taco Kid; hamburger restaurant Next Door; steakhouse Flaming Steer; and barbecue restaurant Sutphen's. All four ventures were unsuccessful and closed by the end of the decade. PepsiCo acquired Pizza Hut in November 1977. The company had over 4,000 locations by this point.

In August 1994, Pizza Hut and the Santa Cruz Operation (SCO) announced PizzaNet, a pilot program in the Santa Cruz area that allowed consumers to use their own computer to order pizza delivery from a local Pizza Hut restaurant, with connection being made over the Internet to a central Pizza Hut server in Wichita, Kansas. The PizzaNet application software was developed by SCO's Professional Services group. PizzaNet was based on the first commercially licensed and bundled Internet operating system, SCO Global Access.

On May 30, 1997, PepsiCo spun off Pizza Hut, along with Taco Bell and Kentucky Fried Chicken, into a new company named Tricon Global Restaurants, Inc. The company assumed the name of Yum! Brands on May 22, 2002.

On March 31, 2011, Priszm, the largest franchisee for Pizza Hut restaurants in Canada at the time, went into bankruptcy protection in Ontario and British Columbia.

In 2015, the oldest continuously operating Pizza Hut, which was the restaurant located in the Aggieville District of Manhattan, Kansas, closed after having opened as the 8th location in 1960.

The company announced a rebrand that began on November 19, 2014, in an effort to increase sales, which had dropped in the previous two years. The menu was expanded to introduce various items such as crust flavors and 11 new specialty pizzas, and the company's employee uniforms were redesigned. In 2017, Pizza Hut was listed by UK-based company Richtopia at number 24 in the list of 200 Most Influential Brands in the World.

By 2018, the chain was no longer the biggest in the United States, having been surpassed by Domino's. On June 25, 2019, Pizza Hut announced it was bringing back the logo and the red roof design that was used from 1976 until 1999.

On August 7, 2019, Pizza Hut announced its intention to close about 500 of its 7,496 dine-in restaurants in the US, by the middle of 2021.

On August 18, 2020, Pizza Hut announced it would be closing up to 300 restaurants after the bankruptcy of NPC International, one of its largest franchisees. In March 2021, Flynn Restaurant Group acquired NPC's 937 Pizza Hut locations.

In 2025, Yum Brands closed 130 Pizza Hut locations. Citing the chain's continuing low sales, Yum Brands announced a strategic review of the chain's operations. In February 2026, it was announced that another 250 stores would close in the first half of 2026. In April 2026, it was reported that Yum was looking to sell the chain to private equity; that June, it was reported that the mainland China business was to be sold for $1.2 billion to Yum China Holdings, Inc., while the rest of the business was to be sold to LongRange Capital for $1.5 billion. The acquisition in China was completed on August 7, 2026, while the acquisition in the rest of the world was completed on September 1, 2026.

== Branding ==
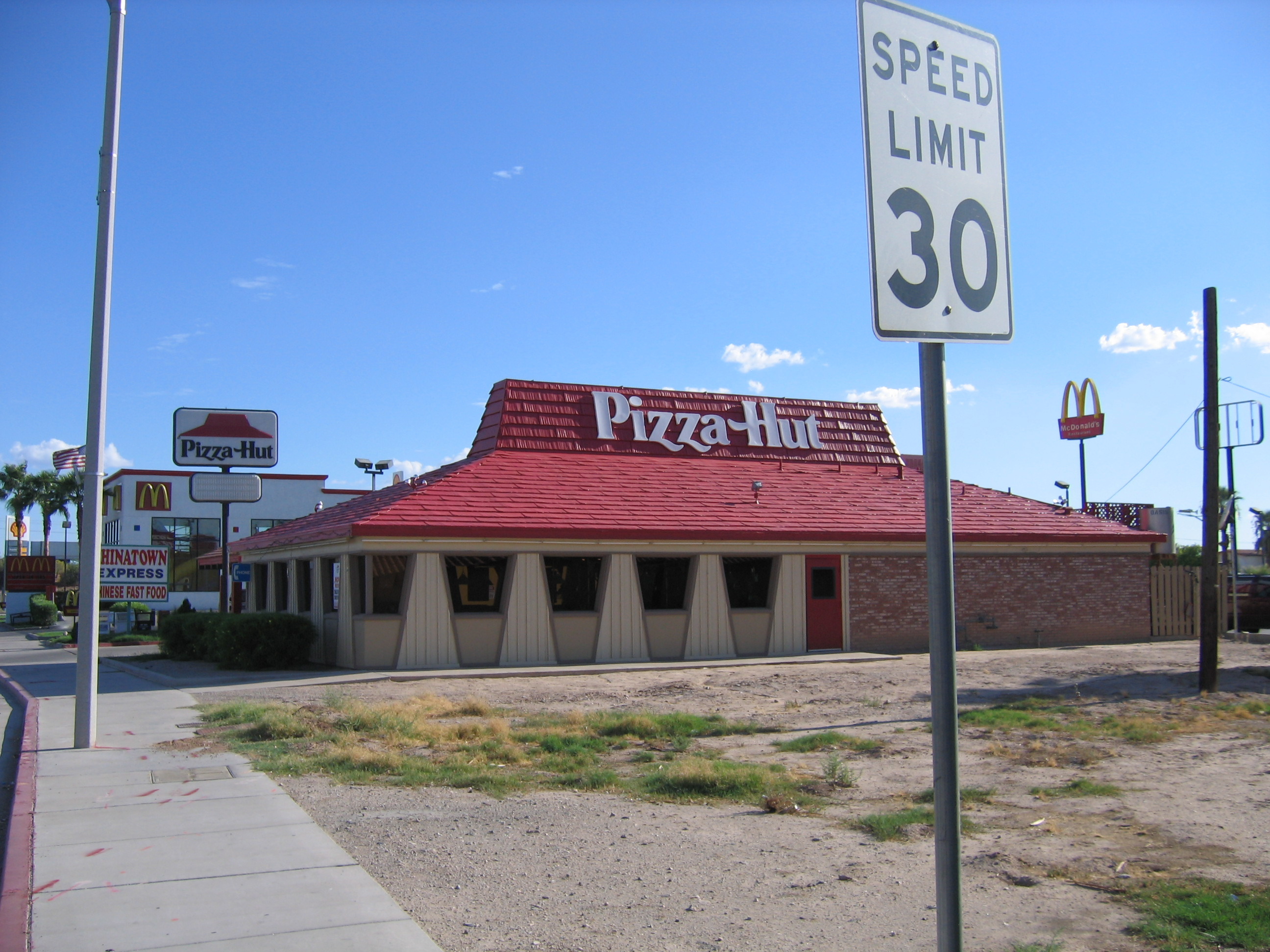
A branch of Pizza Hut in Blythe, California, with the distinctive red roof and corresponding logo. This location has since closed and converted into La Paloma Mexican Food.

A significant part of the Pizza Hut brand is the red roof emblem. It was introduced as a distinctive part of the store building design in 1969, and was later incorporated into the logo. Accounts differ as to its origin; some sources state that the buildings were designed in 1963 by the Chicago architect George Lindstrom, while others state that the buildings were designed by the Wichita architect and college friend of the Carney brothers, Richard D. Burke, for the fee of $100 per store built to this design.

The company's initial mascot was "Pizza Pete", a stereotypical Italian chef mascot. The Pizza Hut logo on roadside signage at this time featured the character, but this was later replaced by a graphical red roof emblem. Some people consider that the red roof emblem resembles a wide-brimmed red hat, especially in German-speaking countries, where the word Hut means hat.

=== Logo evolution ===
1958–1962

1962–1970

1970–1974

1974–1999 (worldwide), 2019–2025, 2026–present (United States)

1998 (prototype)

1999–2010

2008–2016 (international)

2010 (prototype, North America)

2010–2014

2014–2025 (international), 2014–2019 (United States)

2025–present, 2025–2026 (United States)

== Concept ==
In 1975, Pizza Hut began testing concepts with Applegate's Landing. with restaurants that featured Colonial-style exteriors and eclectic interiors that included a truck with a salad bar in the bed. The chain offered much of the same pizza and pasta dishes, with some additions like hamburgers and bread pudding. Applegate's Landing went defunct in the mid-1980s except for one location in McPherson, Kansas, that closed in late 1995.

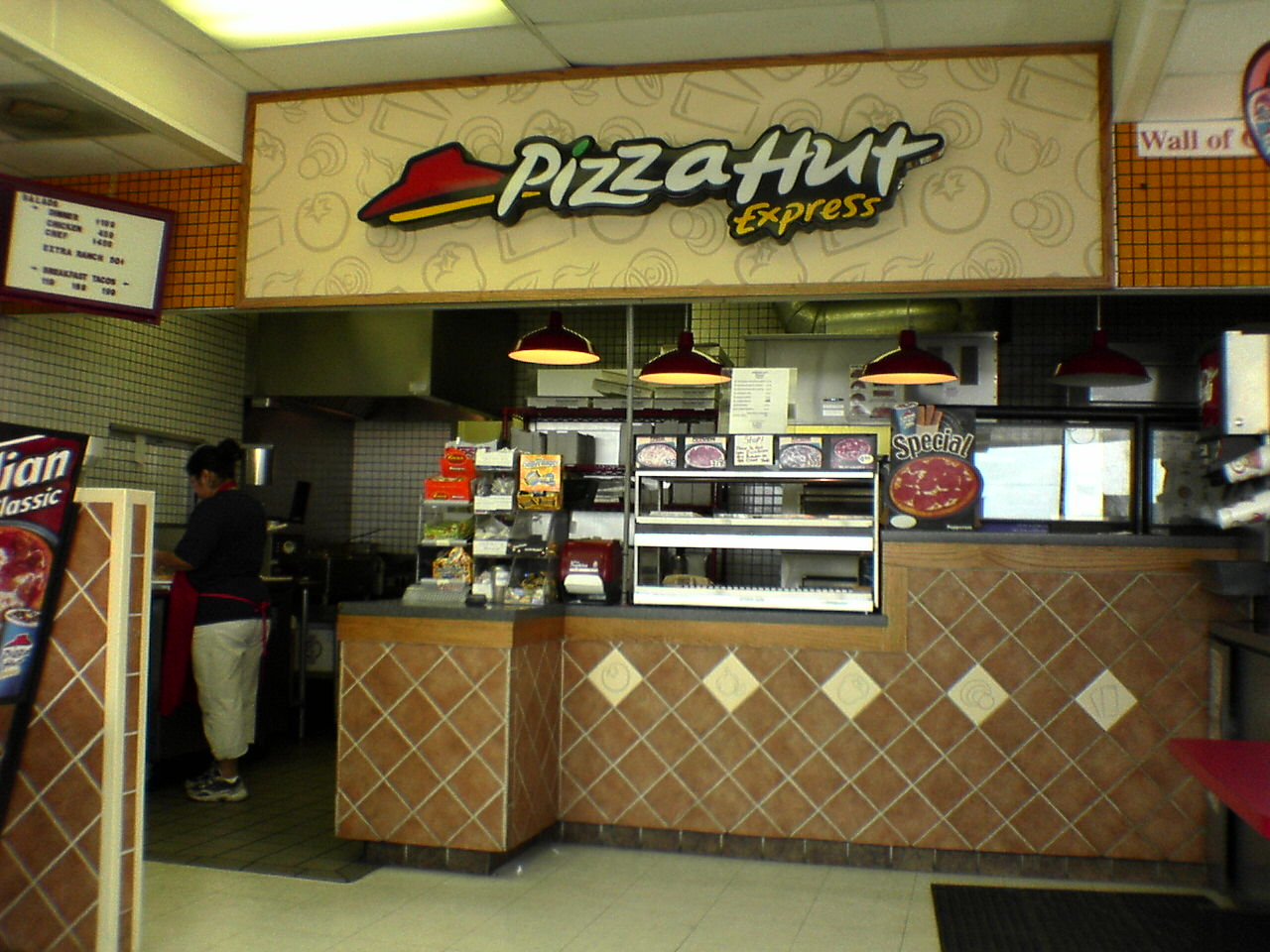
Pizza Hut Express location in San Marcos, Texas

An upscale concept was unveiled in 2004, called Pizza Hut Italian Bistro. At 50 US locations, the Bistro is similar to a traditional Pizza Hut but with a menu that included previously unseen items, such as penne pasta, chicken pomodoro, and toasted sandwiches. Instead of black, white, and red, Bistro locations feature a burgundy and tan motif. In some cases, Pizza Hut has replaced a red roof location with the new concept. Pizza Hut Express locations are fast food restaurants that offer a limited menu with many products not seen at a traditional Pizza Hut. These stores are often paired in a colocation with WingStreet in the US and Canada, or other sibling brands such as KFC or Taco Bell and found on college campuses, food courts, theme parks, bowling alleys, and within stores such as Target.

Vintage locations featuring the red roof, designed by architect Richard D. Burke, can be found in the United States and Canada; several exist in the UK, Australia, and Mexico. In his book Orange Roofs, Golden Arches, Phillip Langdon wrote that the Pizza Hut red roof architecture "is something of a strange object – considered outside the realm of significant architecture, yet swiftly reflecting shifts in popular taste and unquestionably making an impact on daily life. These buildings rarely show up in architectural journals, yet they have become some of the most numerous and conspicuous in the United States today."

In 2014, Curbed.com reported, "Despite Pizza Hut's decision to discontinue the form when they made the shift toward delivery, there were still 6,304 traditional units standing as of 2004, each with the shingled roofs and trapezoidal windows signifying equal parts suburban comfort and strip-mall anomie." This building style was common in the late 1960s and early 1970s. The name "red roof" is somewhat anachronistic now since many locations have brown roofs. Dozens of these restaurants have closed or been relocated or rebuilt.

Many of the older locations with the red roof design serve beer or have a full bar, music from a jukebox, and in some cases an arcade. In the mid-1980s, the company moved into other formats, including delivery or carryout and the fast food "Express" model.

Since 2019, various Pizza Hut locations have been remodeled into Pizza Hut Classic formats, whose interiors emulate those of Pizza Huts in the 1980s and 1990s.

In June 2024, some locations reportedly brought back the all-you-can-eat lunch buffet.

Pizza Hut concepts
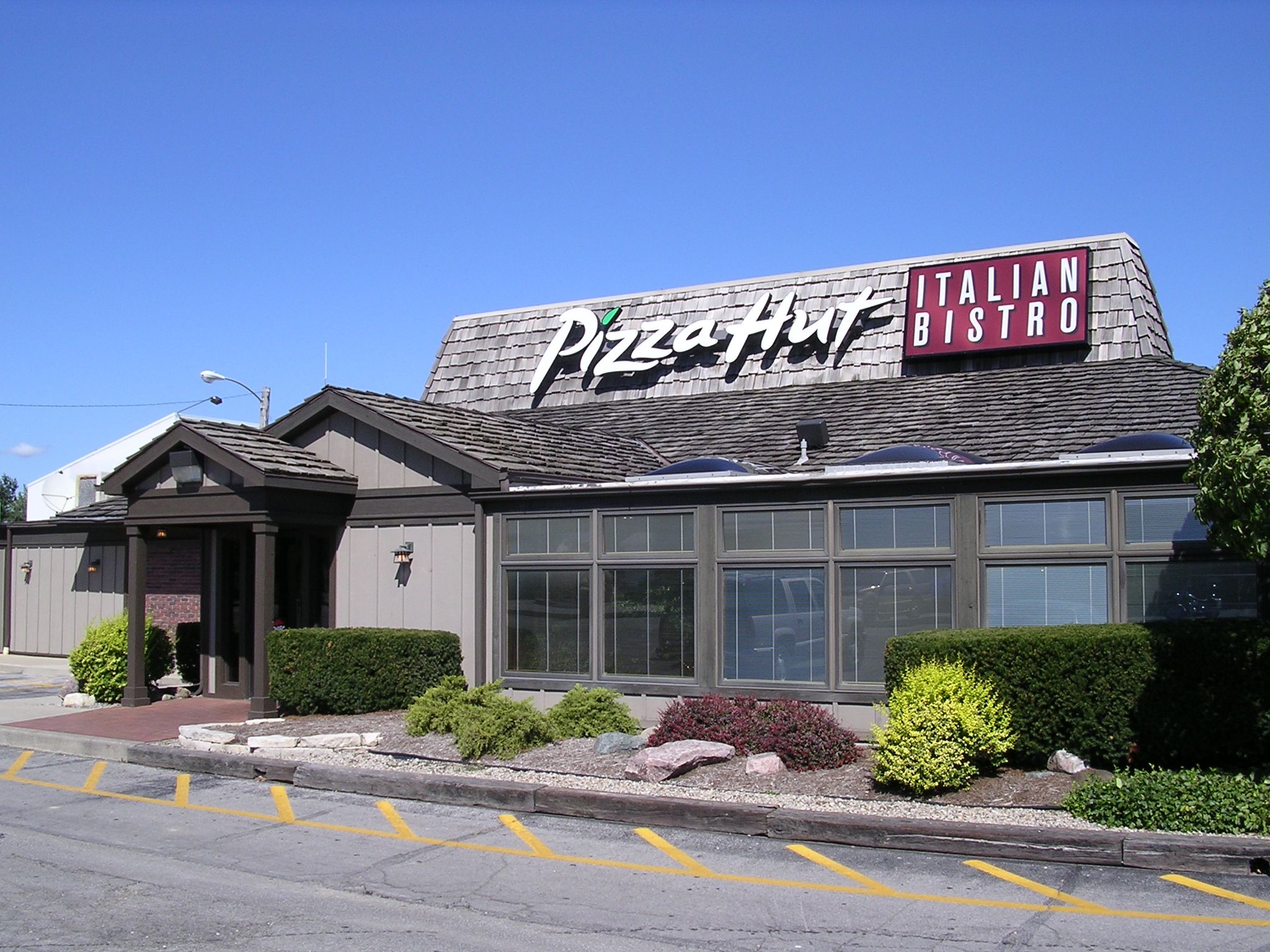
Pizza Hut Bistro in Indianapolis, Indiana, United States

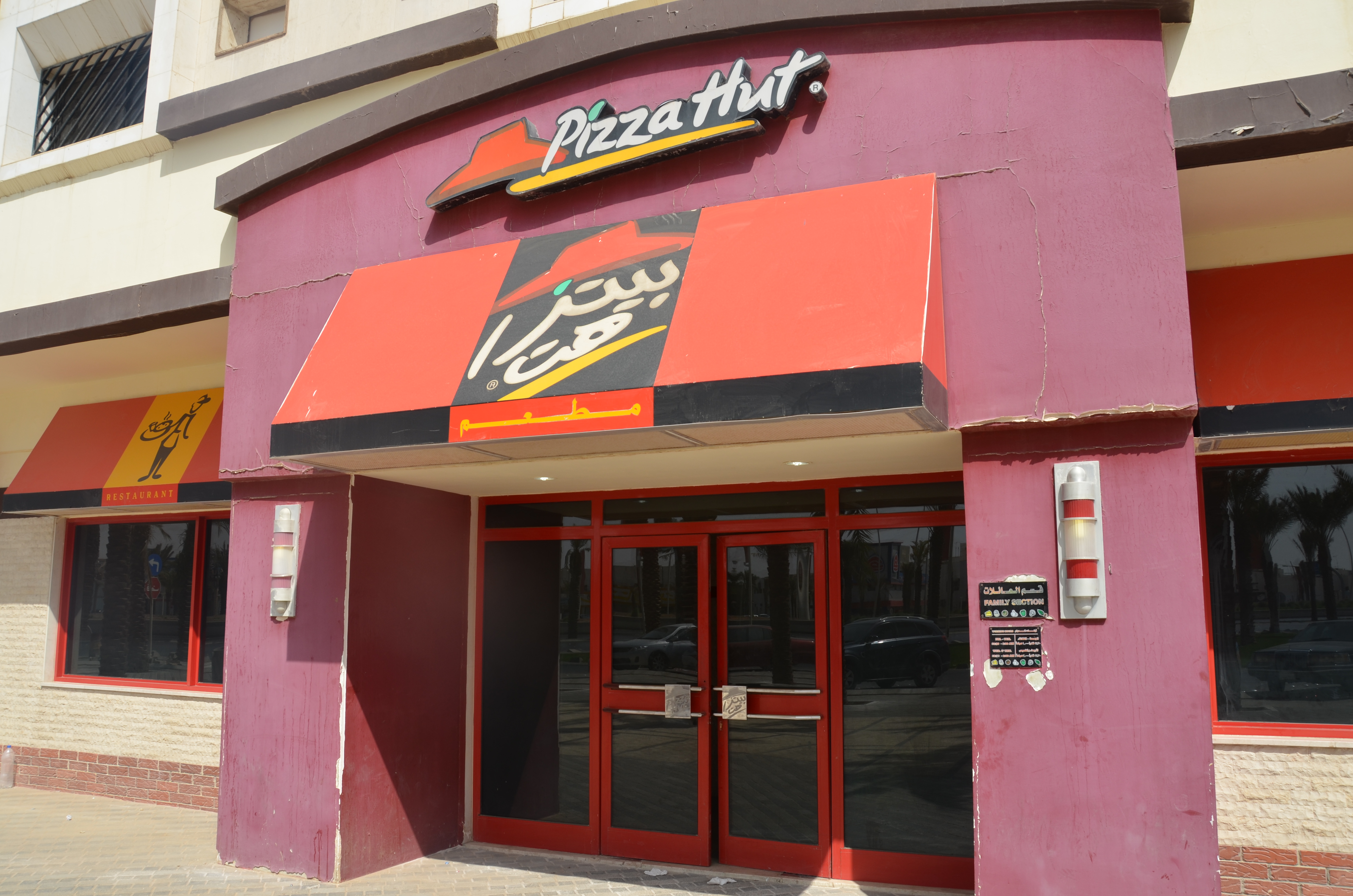
Pizza Hut in Riyadh, Saudi Arabia

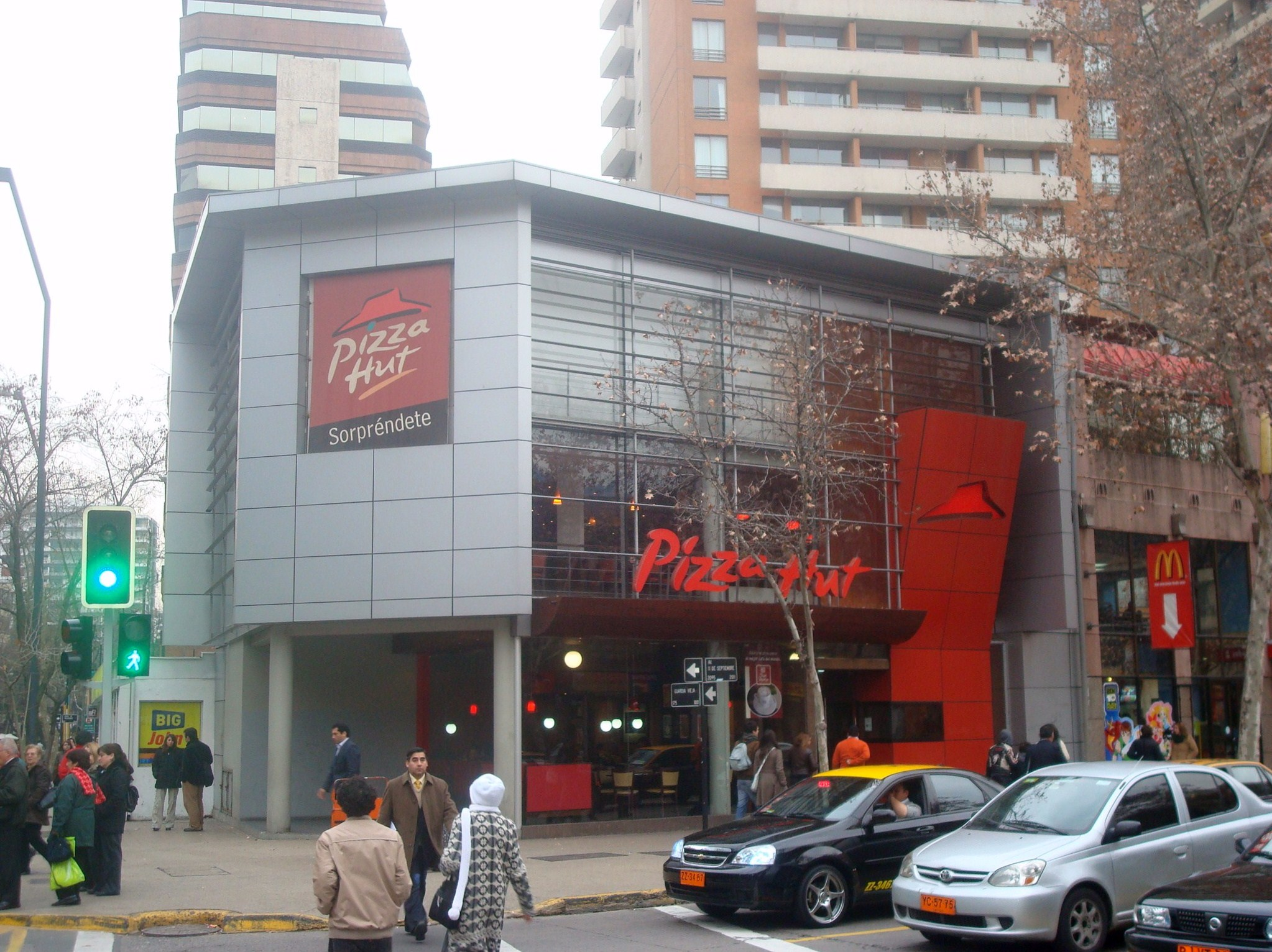
Former Pizza Hut in Santiago, Chile

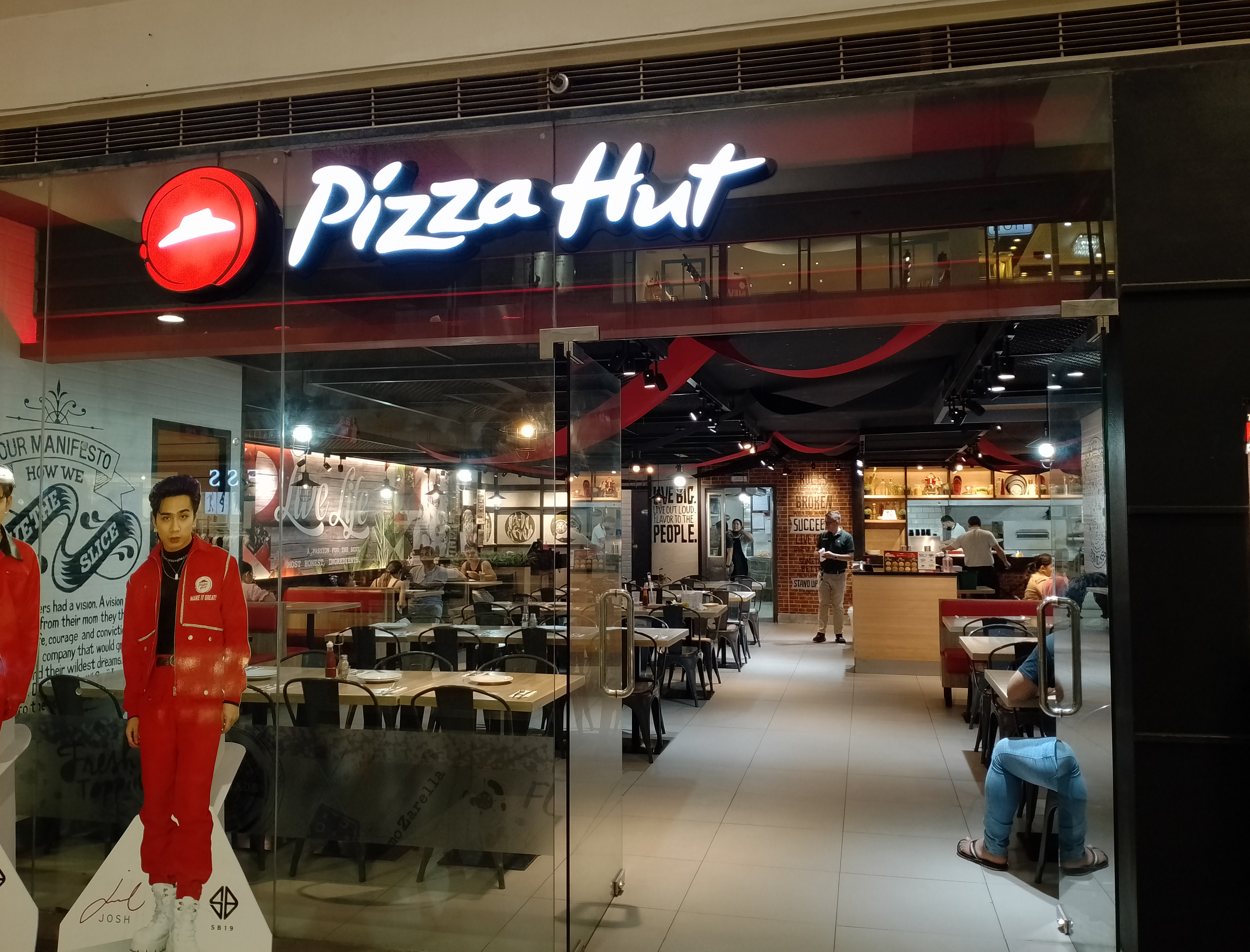
Pizza Hut in Cebu City, Philippines

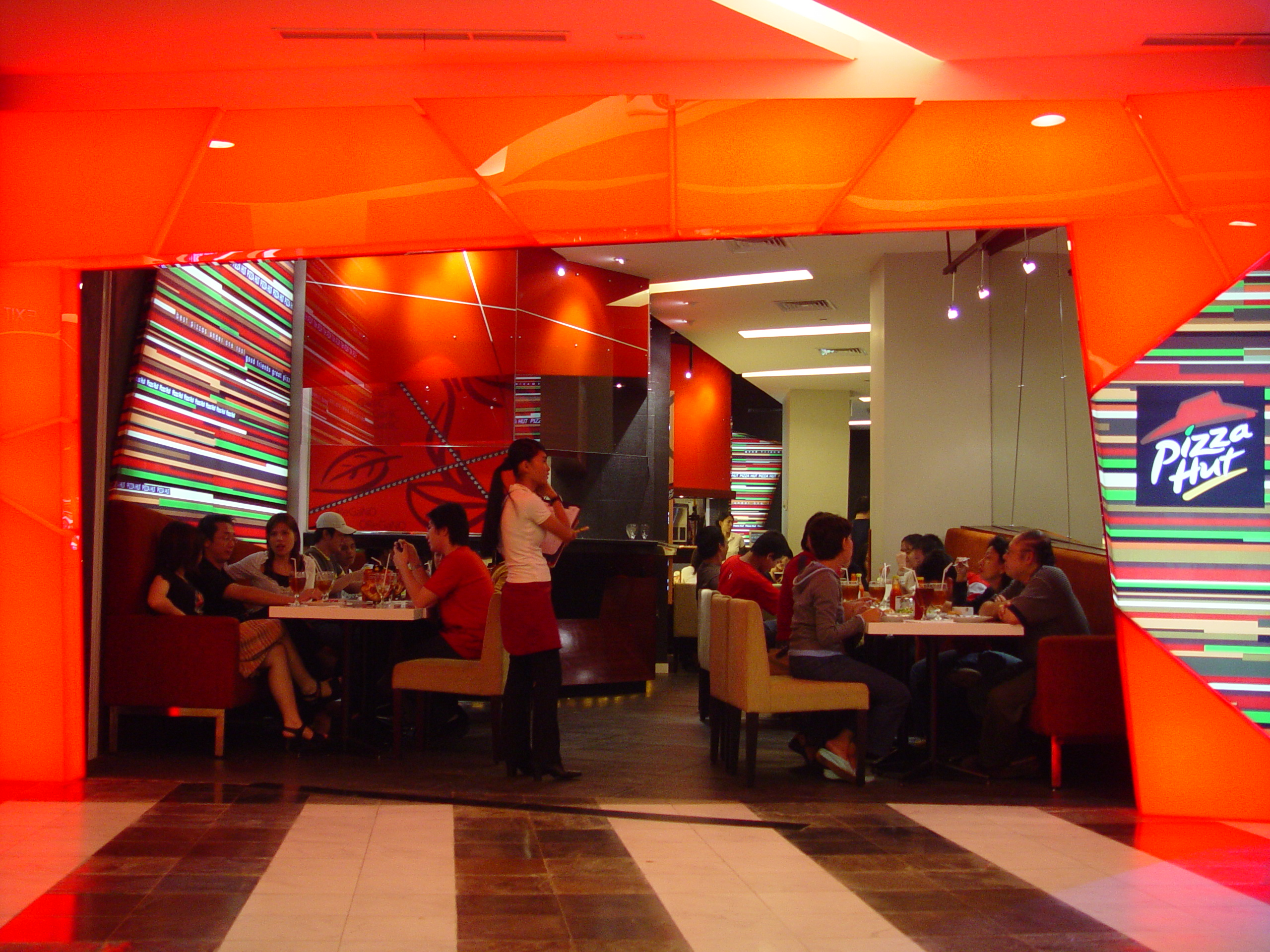
Pizza Hut in Jakarta, Indonesia

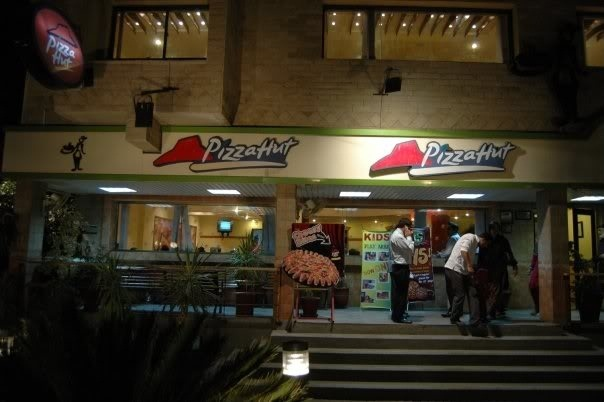
Pizza Hut in Lahore, Pakistan

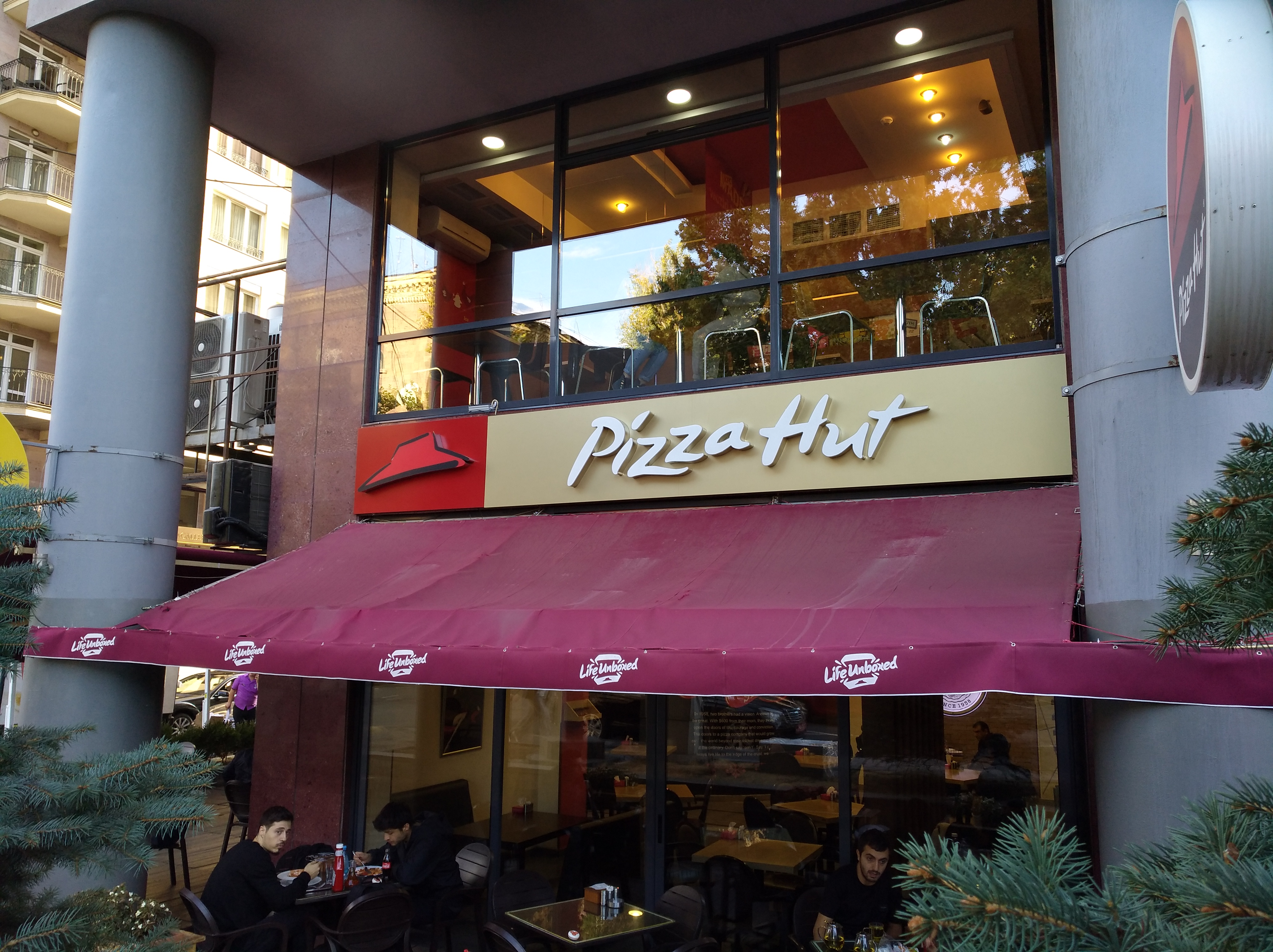
Pizza Hut in Yerevan, Armenia

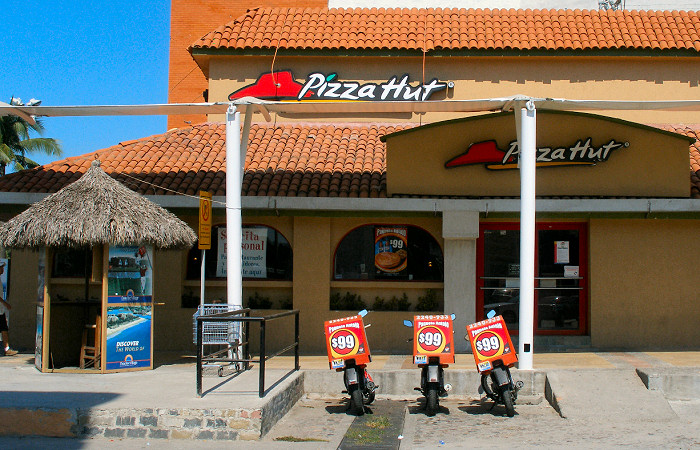
Pizza Hut in Puerto Vallarta, Mexico

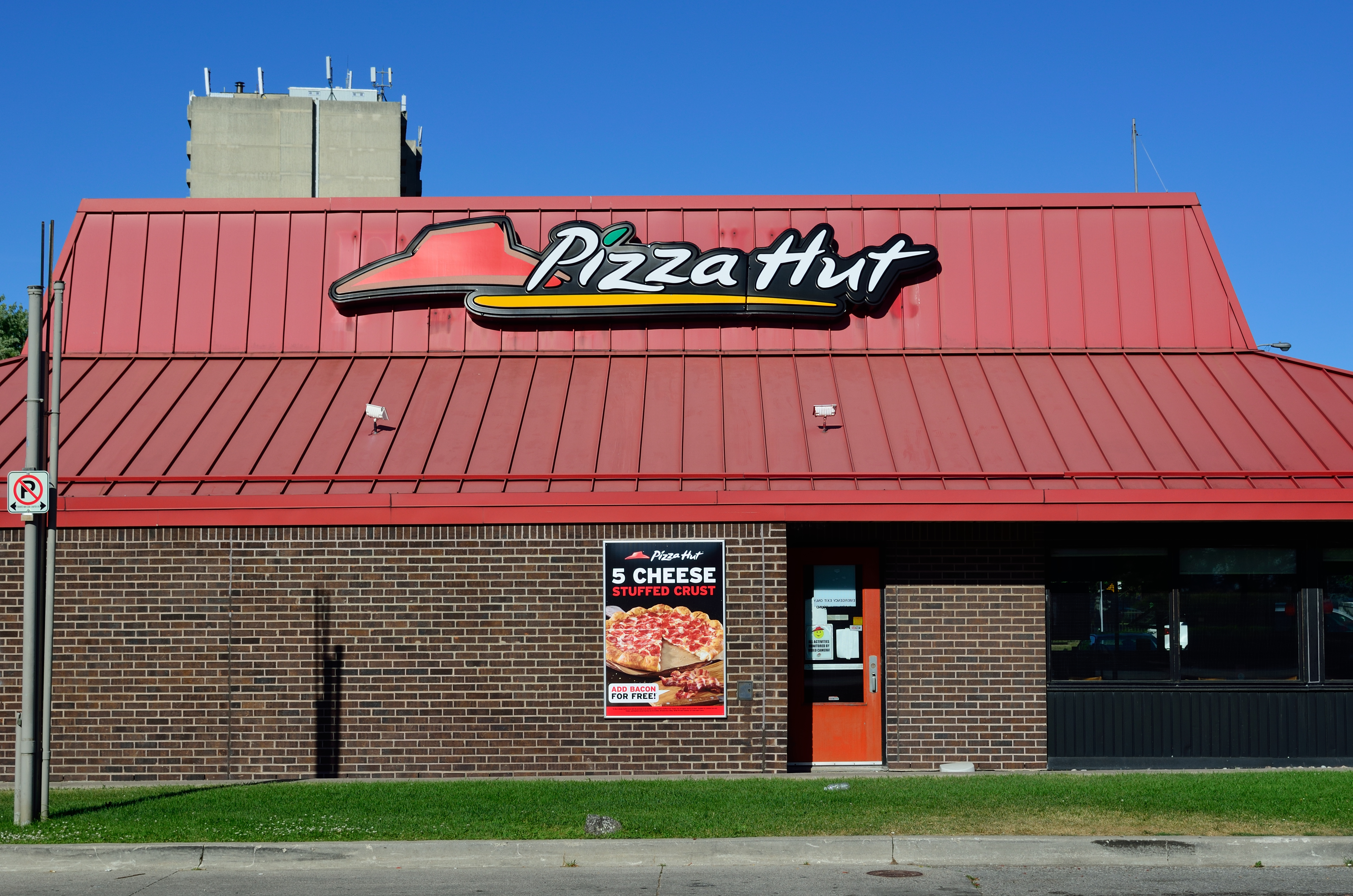
Pizza Hut in North York, Ontario, Canada

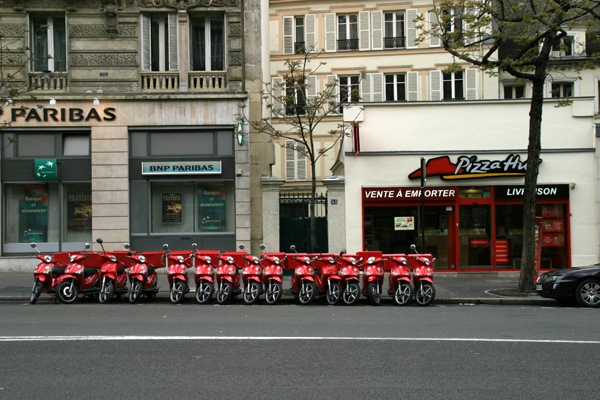
Pizza Hut in Paris, France

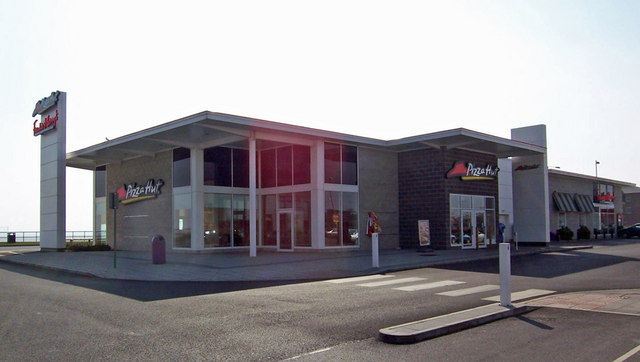
Pizza Hut in Kingston upon Hull, United Kingdom

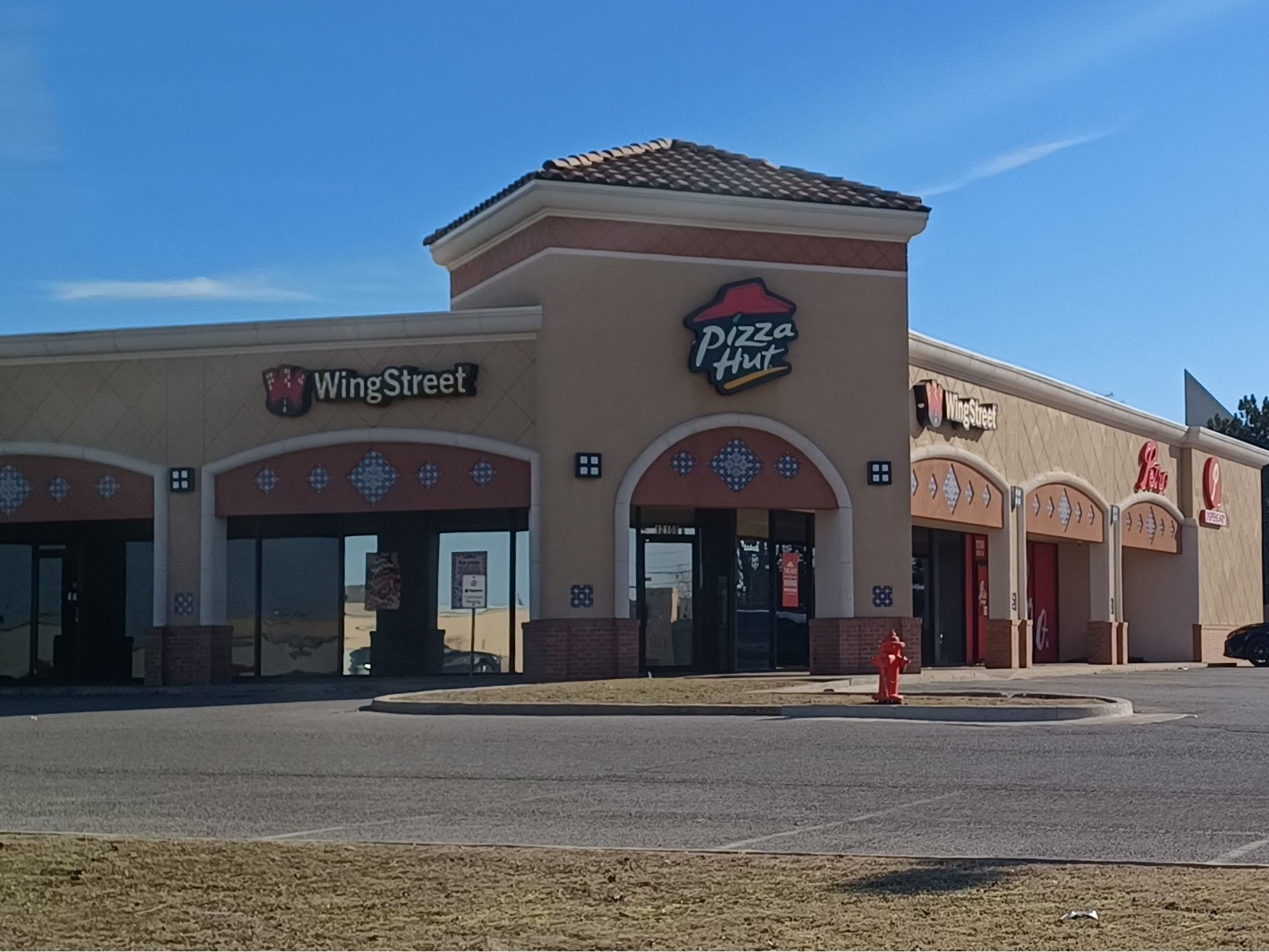
Pizza Hut in Oklahoma City, Oklahoma

== Products ==
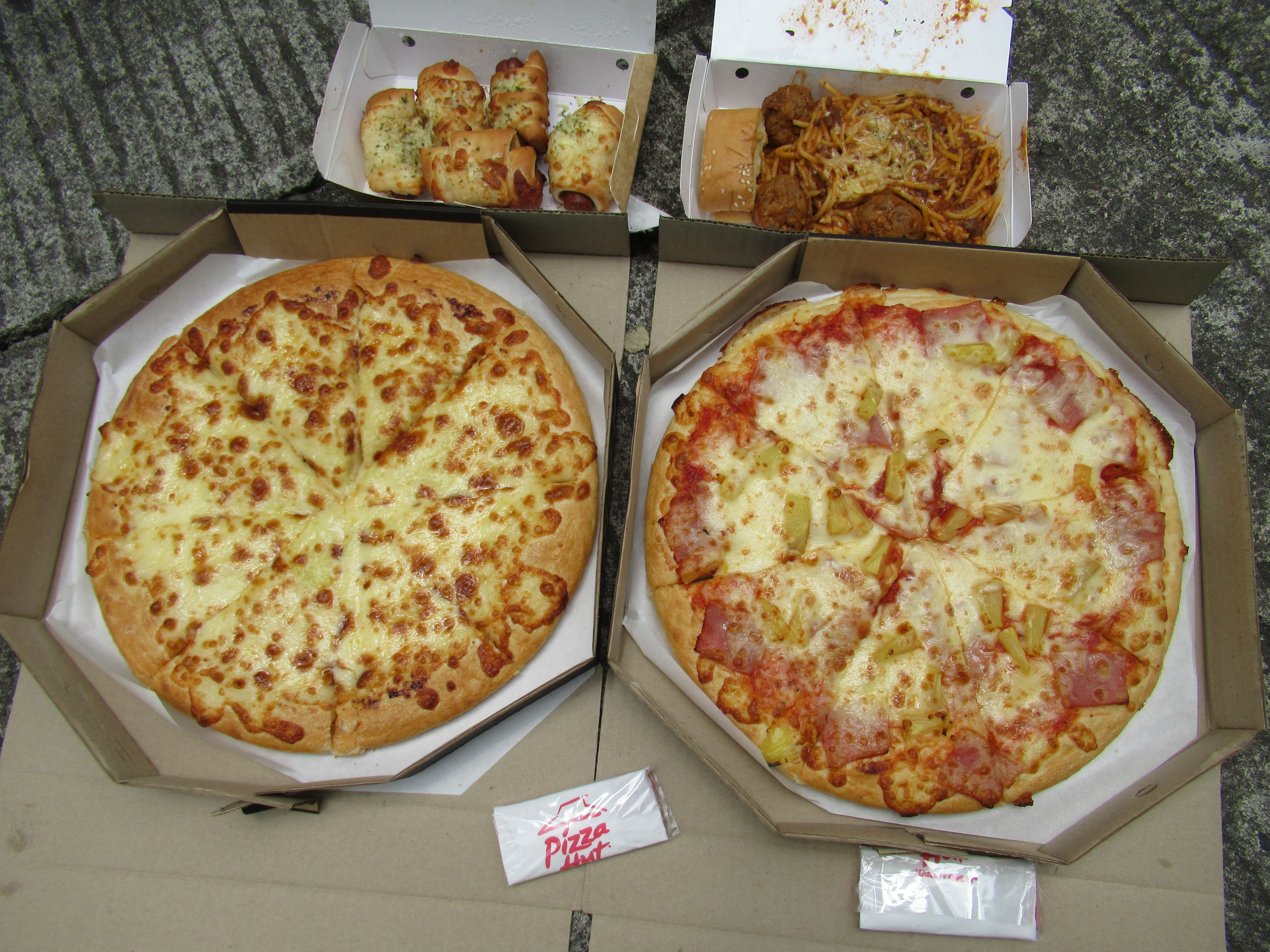
Pizza Hut products in the Philippines

In North America, Pizza Hut has notably sold:

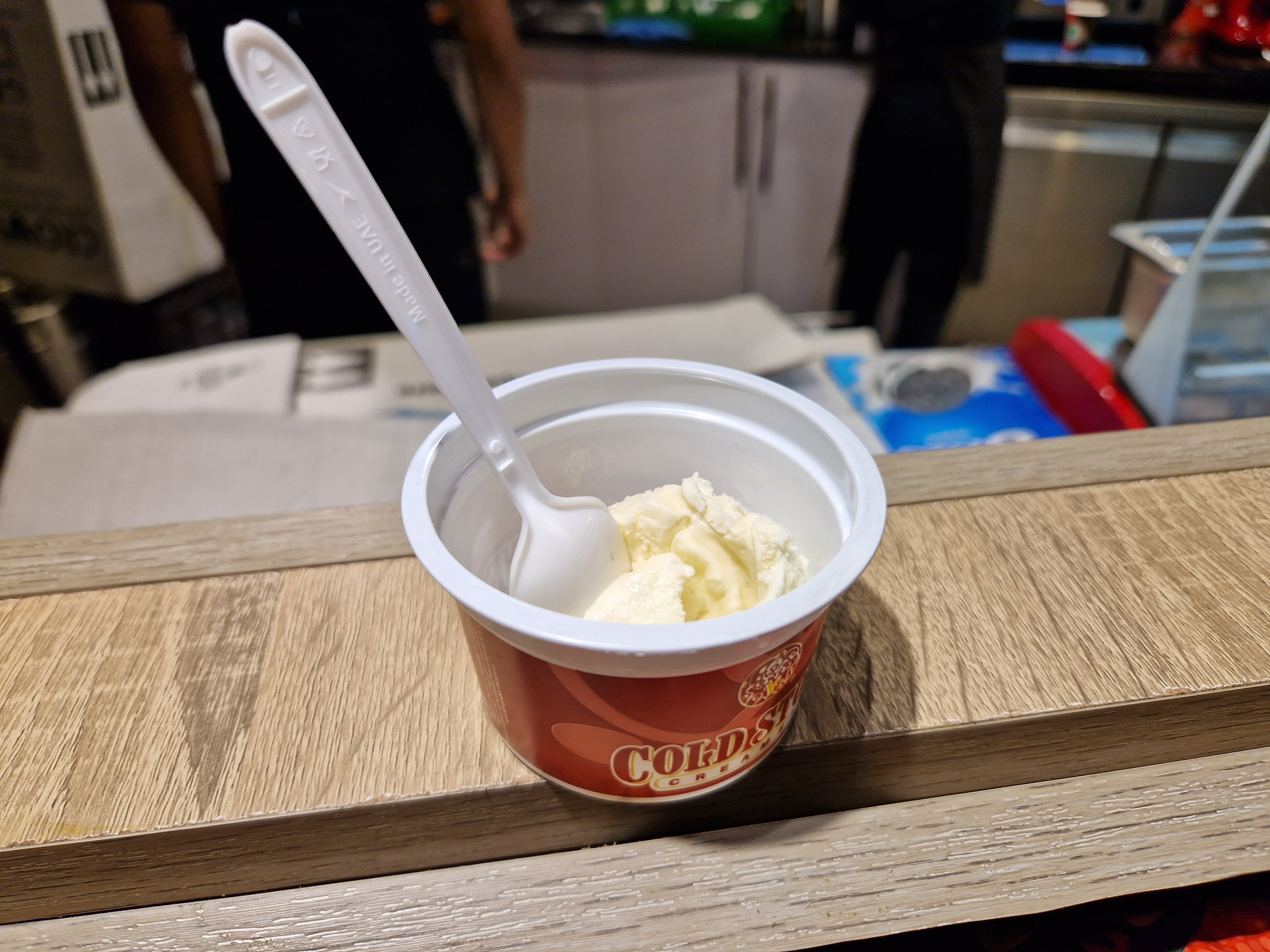
An ice cream ball sold by Pizza Hut restaurant at Addis Ababa Bole International Airport

- Pan pizza, baked in a pan with a crispy edge;
- Stuffed crust pizza, with the outermost edge wrapped around a cylinder of mozzarella cheese;
- "Hand-tossed", more like traditional pizzeria crusts;
- "Thin 'N Crispy", a thin, crisp dough which was Pizza Hut's original style;
- Dippin' Strips pizza, a pizza cut into small strips that can be dipped into a number of sauces;
- The P'Zone, a pizza-calzone hybrid with a marinara dipping sauce that comes in plain, Supremo, Meaty, and pepperoni;
- The Bigfoot pizza, its largest product;
- The Priazzo, a pie like pizza stuffed with pizza ingredients.

The "stuffed crust" pizza was introduced on March 26, 1995. By the end of the year, it had become one of their most popular lines.

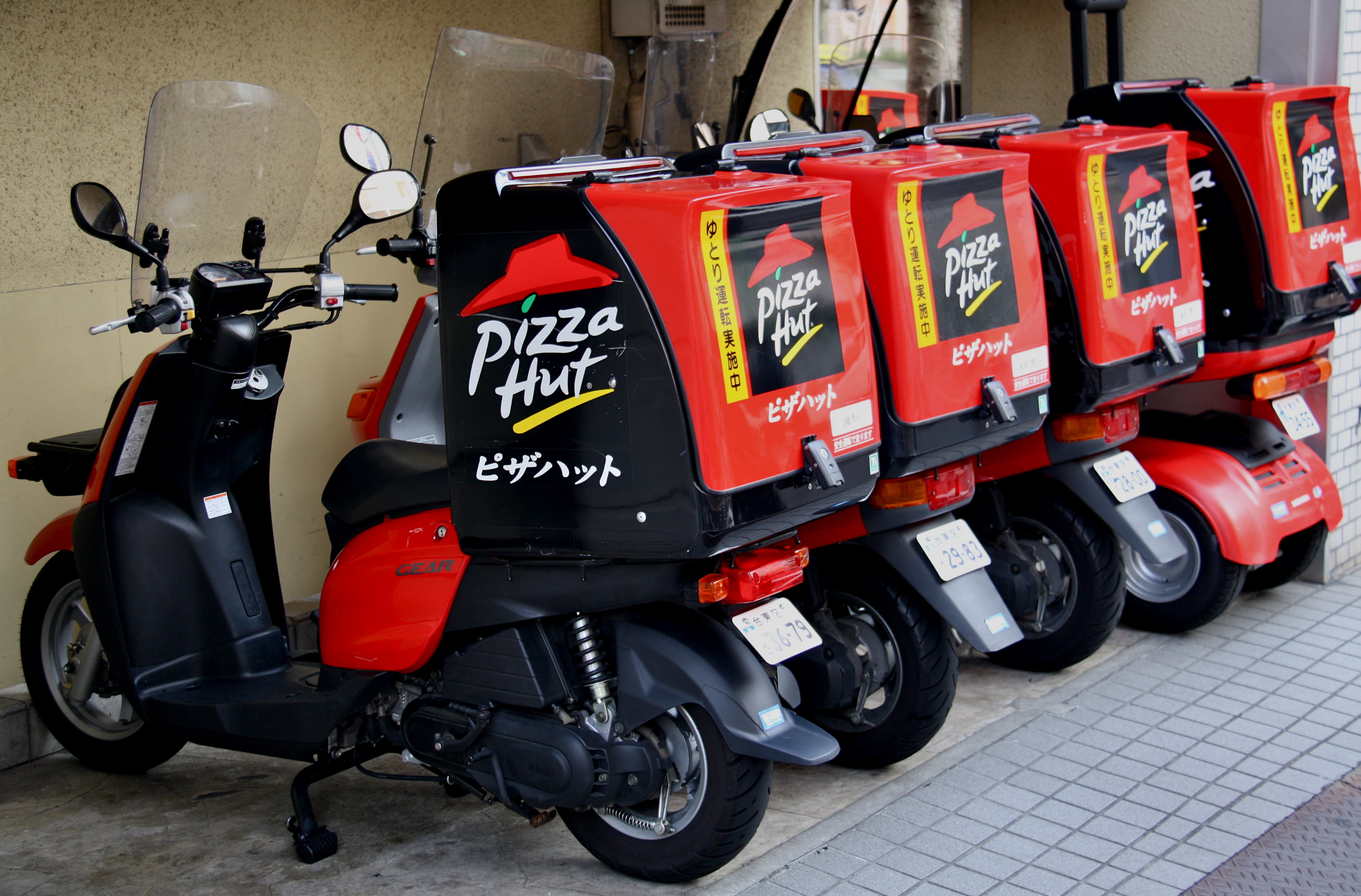
Pizza Hut delivery motorcycles in Japan

Regional differences are seen in the products and bases. The company has localized to Southeast Asia with a baked rice dish called Curry Zazzle.

On May 9, 2008, Pizza Hut created "The Natural" pizza, which featured natural ingredients and was sold in Seattle, Denver and Dallas. This was discontinued on October 27, 2009, in the Dallas market.

Pizza Hut developed a pizza to be delivered to the International Space Station in 2001. It was vacuum-sealed and about 6 in (15 cm) in diameter to fit in the station's oven. It was launched on a Soyuz and eaten by Yuri Usachov in orbit.

In the 2010s, the chain saw a downturn in profits. In 2015, the franchise stated it would be pumping more capital into its London branches. Pizza Hut is installing cocktail bars in its London branches as part of a £60 million bid to win back "the Nando's generation".

In January 2019, Pizza Hut announced it had expanded beer delivery to 300 locations across the US., with plans to expand to 1,000 locations by the middle of the year.

In March 2019, Pizza Hut announced the return of the P'Zone after a hiatus of several years.

In March 2020, Pizza Hut Hong Kong announced that it had partnered with furniture retailer IKEA on a joint venture. IKEA launched a new side table called SÄVA, which was designed to resemble a pizza saver. The table would be boxed in packaging resembling a pizza box, and the building instructions included a suggestion to order a Swedish meatball pizza from Pizza Hut, which would contain the same meatballs served in IKEA restaurants. A 2021 menu addition, designed to commemorate the 25th anniversary of the introduction of stuffed crust pizza, was "nothing but the stuffed crust", a ring of dough filled with cheese.

=== Chicken wings ===
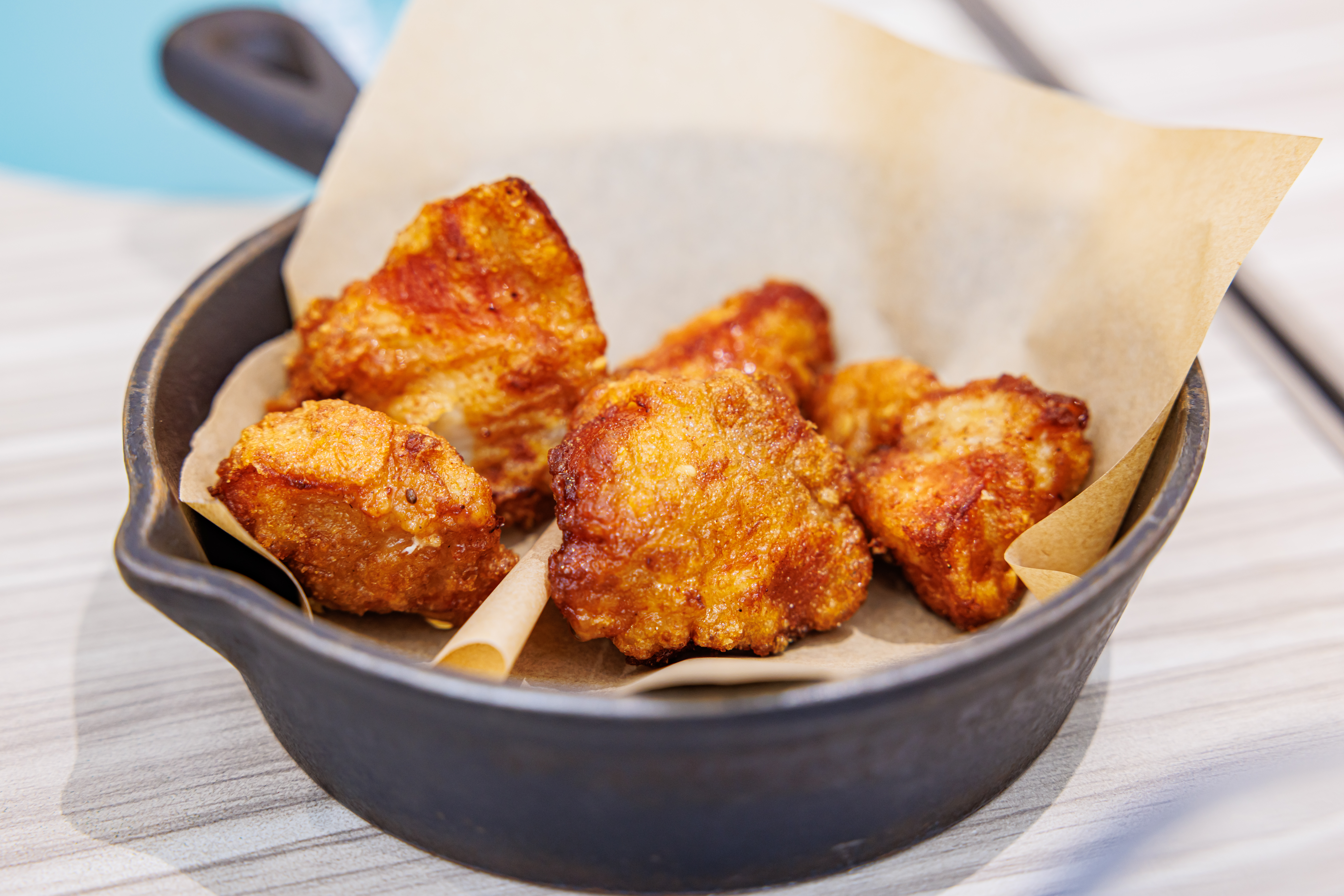
Pizza Hut chicken wings

Pizza Hut also offers a chicken wing menu.

The menu was launched in 2003 under the WingStreet branding in existing Pizza Hut franchises, with the plan to turn WingStreet into a standalone chain. Yum! Brands predicted aggressive growth, adding more than 4,000 locations by 2010. In 2012, the company opened a standalone pilot store in Denton, Texas. The store was unsuccessful and closed the following year.

== International ==
Countries with active Pizza Hut locations

Pizza Hut's international presence under Yum! Brands includes:

- Canada and Mexico in North America
- Japan, India, Bangladesh, Pakistan, Sri Lanka, China, Saudi Arabia, United Arab Emirates, Qatar, Philippines, Vietnam, Thailand, Malaysia, Singapore, Indonesia, Brunei, Hong Kong, Taiwan, South Korea, Myanmar, and Macau in Asia
- United Kingdom, Croatia, and the European Union in Europe
- Egypt in Africa

Pizza Hut's China operations are part of the Yum! spinoff Yum China. Pizza Hut was one of the first American franchises to open in Iraq.

=== Australia ===
Pizza Hut expanded to Australia in 1970, opening its first dine-in restaurant in Belfield in April 1970. In September 2016, private equity firm Allegro Funds and a local management team bought the master franchise agreement for Pizza Hut in Australia from Yum! Brands. In November 2016, Pizza Hut acquired Australian pizza chain Eagle Boys. Half of the Eagle Boys stores were converted to Pizza Hut stores by Christmas 2016 while the remainder were converted by April 2017.

In June 2023, Allegro sold Pizza Hut Australia to US franchise operator Flynn Restaurant Group. As of June 2023, there are about 260 Pizza Hut stores in Australia.

In May 2024, Australian franchisee Pizza Pan Group was penalized with a AU$2.5 million fine for sending 10 million marketing spam messages over four months in violation of Australian spam laws. It had been directed to report regularly to the Australian Communications and Media Authority.

=== China ===
In China, Pizza Hut (simplified Chinese: 必胜客; traditional Chinese: 必勝客; pinyin: Bìshèng Kè) used an altered business model, offering a fine-dining atmosphere with knives and forks and using an expanded menu catering to Chinese tastes. Its first location in the Chinese market opened in Beijing in 1990. By 2008, Pizza Hut operated restaurants and delivery locations. That year, the company introduced "Pizza Hut Express", opening locations in Shanghai, Shenzhen, and Hangzhou. The 160 restaurants were in 40 Chinese cities in 2005. As of 2015, Pizza Hut had 1,903 restaurants in China. By June 2023, there were 3,000 stores. As of the end of September 2025, Pizza Hut has over 4,000 outlets in over 1,000 cities.

Savio S. Chan (陳少宏, Pinyin: Chén Shàohóng) and Michael Zakkour, authors of China's Super Consumers: What 1 Billion Customers Want and How to Sell it to Them, stated middle-class Chinese perceive Pizza Hut as "akin to fine dining", though Pizza Hut was "China's largest and most successful foreign casual-dining chain".

=== Ethiopia ===
In 2018, Pizza Hut officially opened in Ethiopia.

=== New Zealand ===
The first Pizza Hut store in New Zealand was established in New Lynn 1974 by businessman Garry Melville-Smith, who bought the franchise rights for the country. By 1990, 36 stores had been established across New Zealand. The franchise originated as a dine-in restaurant targeting families and also served alcohol, pasta, salad bars and desserts. Pizza Hut dominated the New Zealand fast food market during the 1970s, 1980s and 1990s, holding 75% of the market share at its peak. The franchise's success encouraged other fast food chains including Domino's, Eagle Boys, Pizza Haven and Hell Pizza to enter the New Zealand market. In 1996, Melville-Smith sold the New Zealand franchise back to PepsiCo, which subsequently rebranded as Restaurant Brands in 1997.

In 1998, Pizza Hut shifted from a dine-in restaurant chain towards a takeaway and delivery service in response to changes in consumer behaviour. In 2000, Restaurant Brands acquired Eagle Boys' New Zealand operations, which were rebranded as Pizza Hut stores. In February 2016, the original New Lynn dine-in restaurant was demolished and replaced with a takeaway store. In late September 2024, Pizza Hut celebrated the 50th anniversary of its establishment in New Zealand by holding pop-up lunch and dinner buffet and dessert events in Auckland.

=== Pakistan ===
Pizza Hut Pakistan (Urdu: پیزاہٹ پاکستان) is the Pakistani franchisee of Pizza Hut. It is owned by MCR (Pvt) Ltd and is headquartered in Karachi, Pakistan. The first outlet was opened in Karachi in 1993. Currently, Pizza Hut has a presence in 23 major cities.

=== Puerto Rico ===
In November 2026, Yum! Brands temporarily closed all Pizza Hut locations in Puerto Rico as the operator, Encanto Restaurants, filed for Chapter 11 bankruptcy protection.

=== South Korea ===
As of August 2018, Pizza Hut has 324 franchises in South Korea since it opened its first store in 1985.

=== United Kingdom ===
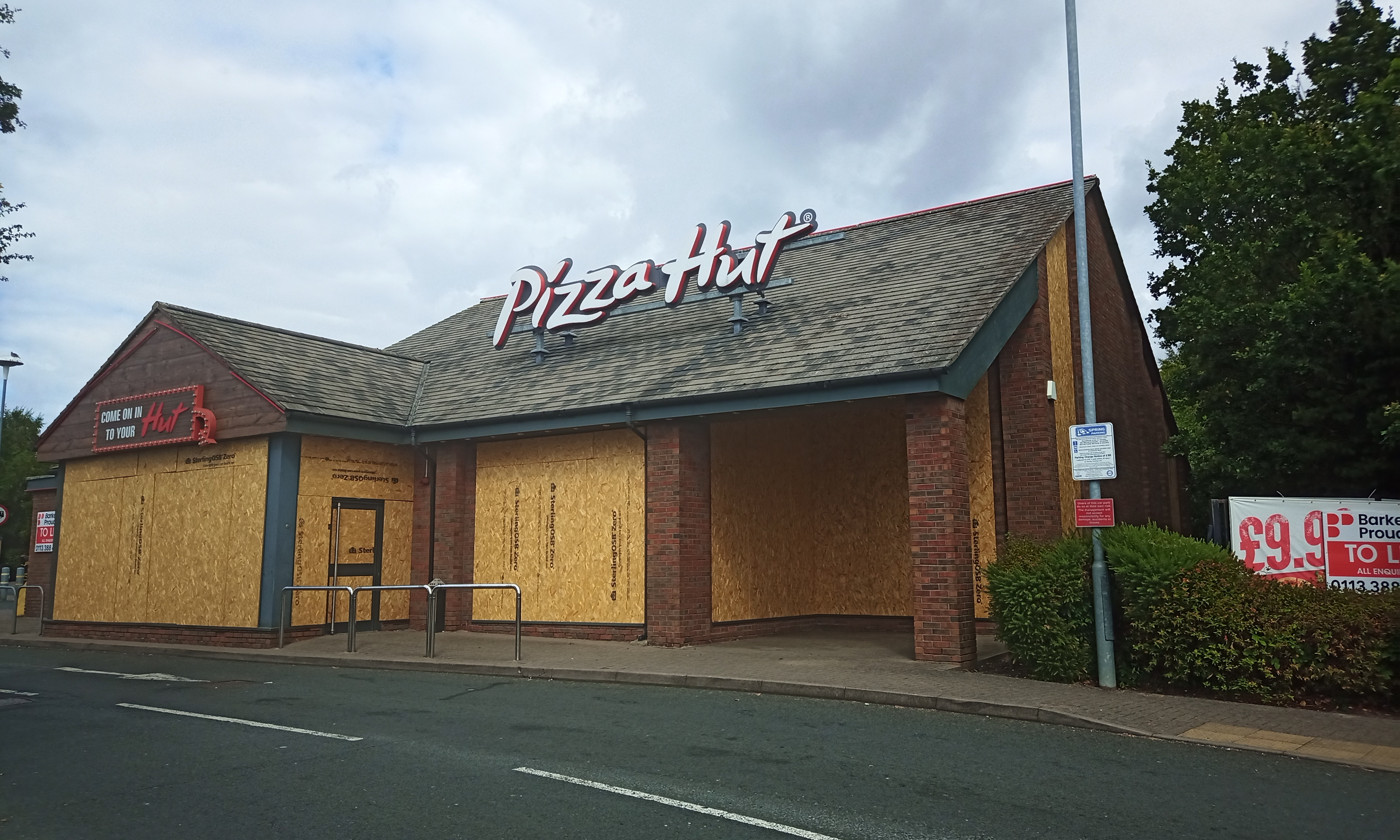
Abandoned Pizza Hut in Colton, Leeds.

Pizza Hut first opened in the UK in 1973. In 2023, UK Pizza Hut restaurants added Beyond Meat Pepperoni to its menus with pizzas that include the Big New Yorker with vegan cheese and Beyond Pepperoni.

In October 2025, Pizza Hut entered administration in the UK, with plans to close 68 of its restaurants, which will result in the loss of 1,277 jobs. 64 remaining restaurants will be acquired by Yum! III (UK) Limited as part of a prepackaged deal. Pizza Hut restaurants facing closure in the UK include popular branch locations such as Romford Retail Park, Greenwich Peninsula, and Hayes Retail Park, The Standard reports.

=== Former markets ===
- Russia – Pizza Hut began operating in Russia in 1991, when food supplies dwindled during the 1991 Soviet coup d'état attempt, prompting Russian president Boris Yeltsin to call Pizza Hut deliveries. Pizza Hut suspended operations in response to the 2022 Russian invasion of Ukraine. Later some restaurants re-opened operations under rebranded new trademark PittsaN (ПиццаН).
- Panama – In 2022, the Pizza Hut chain ceased its operations in Panamanian lands after reporting economic losses.
- Argentina – Pizza Hut opened in Argentina in 1983; however, they withdrew some time later. They returned in the mid-1990s but withdrew again in 1998 due to poor sales success. It was announced that it will be brought back to the country in 2025, but the exact date has not been confirmed.
- Chile – In 2025, the Pizza Hut chain downsized its operations in Chile as one of its two franchising concerns, Food Delivery Brands (which also handled Telepizza), went bankrupt as a result of the economic crisis the country had faced in the past decade and increasing competition from rival chains such as Little Caesars and Papa John's.

== Advertising ==
=== United States ===
Pizza Hut's first television commercial was produced in 1965 by Bob Walterscheidt for the Harry Crow agency in Wichita, and was entitled "Putt-Putt to the Pizza Hut". The ad looks just like an old movie and is set in fast motion. It features a man in a business suit and tie, played by Ron Williams, who was then a production manager for Wichita's ABC affiliate KAKE-TV, as he orders take-out, leaves his house, and gets into his 1965 Mustang JR to drive to Pizza Hut, where he is chased by a variety of townspeople, portrayed by neighborhood kids, Walterscheidt and his daughter, and various employees for Harry Crow and KAKE-TV. He goes inside Pizza Hut to pick up his pizza and drives home. People eat all the pizza before the man who ordered it can get any, which makes the man very upset, so he calls Pizza Hut again. The ad first aired on November 19, 1966, during halftime of the Notre Dame vs. Michigan State "Game of the Century", and dramatically increased sales for the franchise. "Putt-Putt to the Pizza Hut" ran on TV for eight years and was nominated for a Clio Award.

Until early 2007, Pizza Hut's main advertising slogan was "Gather 'round the good stuff". From 2008 to 2009, the advertising slogan was "Now You're Eating!" From 2009 to 2012, the advertising slogan was "Your Favorites. Your Pizza Hut" From 2012 to 2016, the advertising slogan was "Make it great", a variation of the 1987–1995 slogan "Makin' it great!". From 1995 to 1999, the slogan was "You'll love the stuff we're made of". The advertising slogan is currently "No one outpizzas the hut".

Pizza Hut sponsored the film Back to the Future Part II (1989) and offered a free pair of futuristic sunglasses, known as "Solar Shades", with the purchase of Pizza Hut pizza. Pizza Hut also engaged in product placement within the film, having a futuristic version of their logo with their trademarked red hut printed on the side of a mylar dehydrated pizza wrapper in the McFly family dinner scene, and appear on a storefront in Hill Valley in the year 2015.

In 1990, Pizza Hut spent a reported $20 million to sponsor the Teenage Mutant Ninja Turtles Coming Out of Their Shells live musical. The company also gave out a Ninja Turtle audio cassette as part of a promotion. The 1990 NES game Teenage Mutant Ninja Turtles II: The Arcade Game came with a coupon for a free pizza. The game included Pizza Hut product placement in the form of background advertisements and pizza that would refill the character's life.

In the early 1990s, Pizza Hut sought to attract children and pre-teenagers to build its dine-in business. Through comedy writer Walter Williams and San Francisco advertising agency Goodby, Silverstein & Partners, Pizza Hut created The Pizza Head Show, a series of television commercials to convey the message that Pizza Hut meant "weird fun". The commercials featured spokes-character Pizza Head and his pizza-cutter nemesis Steve, in a format reminiscent of Williams's previous production Mr. Bill.

In 1995, Donald Trump and his first wife Ivana Trump appeared in a commercial. The last scene of the commercial showed Ivana asking for the last slice, to which Donald replied, "Actually, you're only entitled to half", a play on the couple's recent divorce.

In 1995, Ringo Starr appeared in a Pizza Hut commercial that teased to a Beatles reunion, but featured three members of the Monkees. A commercial with Rush Limbaugh dates from the same year, in which he boasts "nobody is more right than me", yet he states for the first time he will do something wrong, which was to participate in Pizza Hut's then "eating pizza crust first" campaign regarding their stuffed crust pizzas.

In 1999, the announcer says, "The best pizzas under one roof" in the Big New Yorker pizza commercial seen on the PlayStation Pizza Hut Demo Disc 1. Also, in 1999, the game Crazy Taxi for the Dreamcast featured Pizza Hut as one of the locations to which players were able to drive and drop off customers. However, in the game's 2010 re-release for Xbox Live and PlayStation Network, all of the product placement, including the Pizza Hut locations, were removed and replaced with generic locations.

Early 2007 had Pizza Hut move into several more interactive ways of marketing to the consumer. Using mobile-phone SMS technology and their MyHut ordering site, they aired several television commercials (commencing just before the Super Bowl) containing hidden words that viewers could type into their phones to receive coupons. Other innovative efforts included their "MySpace Ted" campaign, which took advantage of the popularity of social networking, and the burgeoning user-submission marketing movement via their Vice President of Pizza contest.

In 2023, as a promotional tie-in to the Teenage Mutant Ninja Turtles: Mutant Mayhem animated film, Pizza Hut began offering delivery to designated locations in the New York City subway.

=== United Kingdom ===
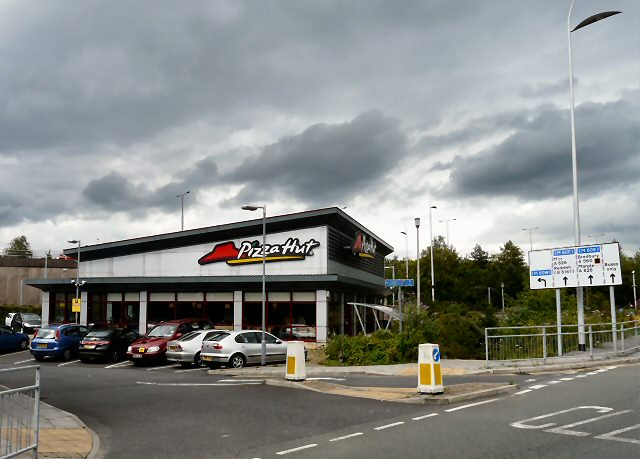
Pizza Hut location in Stockport, England

In 1996, as part of Pizza Hut's global advertising strategy using celebrities, Formula One driver Damon Hill and BBC motorsport commentator Murray Walker advertised the stuffed crust pizza, which parodies Walker's extravagant style.

Talk show host Jonathan Ross co-starred in an ad with American model Caprice Bourret. They advertised the new stuffed crust pizza, with Jonathan Ross saying "stuffed cwust" due to his rhotacism.

Following England's defeat to Germany on penalties in the semifinals of Euro '96, Gareth Southgate, Stuart Pearce, and Chris Waddle featured in an advertisement, which shows Southgate wearing a paper bag over his head in shame as his penalty miss allowed England to lose the shootout. Waddle and Pearce, who both missed in a shootout vs West Germany at World Cup '90, are ridiculing him, emphasizing the word "miss" at every opportunity. After Southgate finishes his pizza, he takes off his paper bag, heads for the door, and bangs his head against the wall. Pearce responds with, "this time he's hit the post".

=== Russia ===
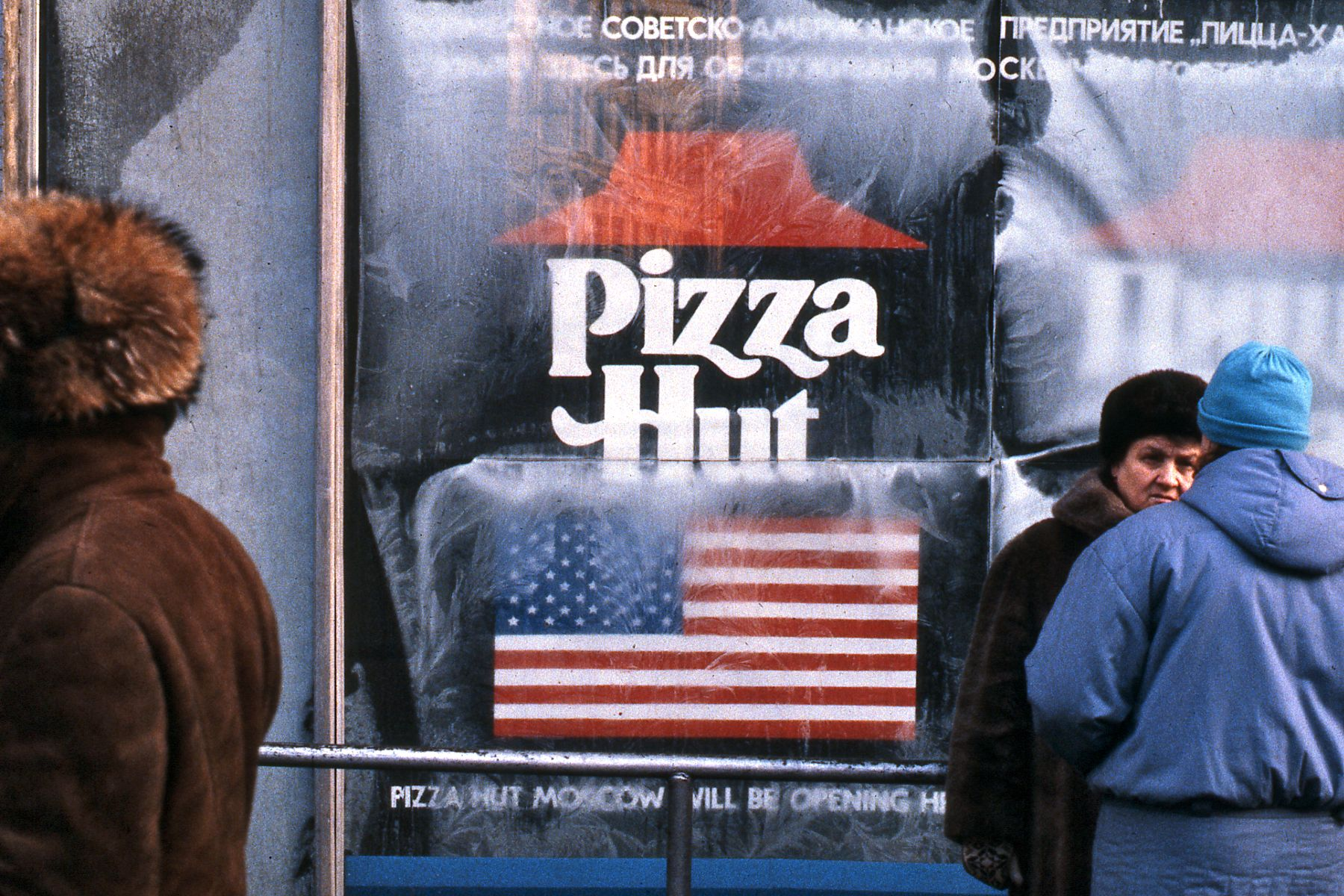
Pizza Hut advertisement in Moscow, Russia, in January 1990, just before the restaurant opened

Former Soviet Union leader Mikhail Gorbachev starred in a 1998 Pizza Hut commercial with his granddaughter Anastasia Virganskaya to raise money for the Perestroyka Archives. The ad "obviously exploited the shock value of having a former world leader appear... [and] played on the fact that Gorbachev was far more popular outside Russia than inside it". It was filmed on a multi-million budget with a cinematic quality, including mounting cameras on the Kremlin and shutting down Red Square to get the establishing shots of the square, and dialogue entirely in Russian with English subtitles, to show Pizza Hut as a global brand compared to its American rivals.

More recently, Pizza Hut has had various celebrity spokespeople, including Jessica Simpson, the Muppets, Damon Hill, and Murray Walker.

In 2000, Pizza Hut paid for their logo to appear on a Russian Proton rocket, which launched the Russian Zvezda module.

=== Pasta Hut ===
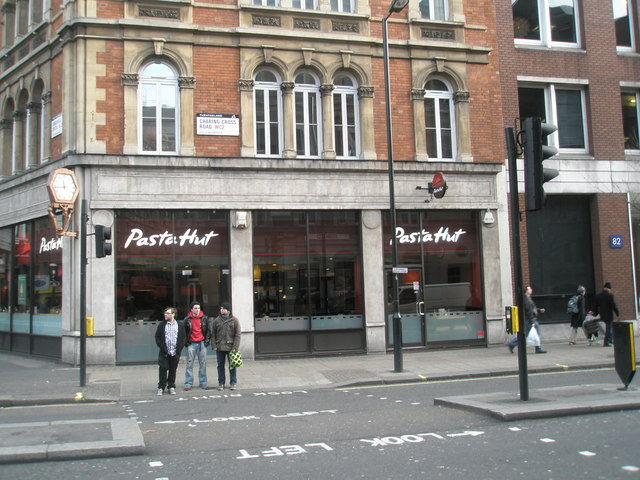
A branch of Pizza Hut rebranded as "Pasta Hut" on Charing Cross Road, London, in 2009

On April 1, 2008, Pizza Hut in America sent emails to customers advertising their pasta items. The email (and similar advertising on the company's website) stated: "Pasta so good, we changed our name to Pasta Hut!" The name change was a publicity stunt held on April Fools' Day, extending through the month of April, with the company's Dallas headquarters changing its exterior logo to Pasta Hut.

This name change was also used to promote the new Tuscani Pasta line and the new Pizza Hut dine-in menu. The first Pasta Hut advertisement showed the original Pizza Hut restaurant being imploded and re-created with a "Pasta Hut" sign.

A version of this stunt was re-created by Pizza Hut's UK operation later that year in October 2008, which included ten locations in London temporarily taking on new "Pasta Hut" signage. Pizza Hut UK's chief executive at the time has insisted that this was solely intended as a "PR exercise" and the chain never planned on permanently changing its name in the UK or elsewhere.

=== Sponsorships ===
- In the early 1990s, as part of PepsiCo's sponsorship of The NewsHour with Jim Lehrer (and its former moniker, The MacNeil/Lehrer NewsHour), Pizza Hut was included in the acknowledgment alongside Taco Bell and KFC, which PepsiCo owned at the time.
- In 2000, Pizza Hut was a part-time sponsor of Galaxy Motorsports' #75 Ford in the then NASCAR Cup Series, driven by Wally Dallenbach Jr.
- Pizza Hut was the shirt sponsor of English football club Fulham F.C. for the 2001–02 season.
- Terry Labonte drove selected events with Pizza Hut as the primary sponsor of his #44 car for Hendrick Motorsports in 2005. Brian Vickers also drove a Pizza Hut car in the NASCAR Busch Series for Hendrick.
- Pizza Hut purchased the naming rights to Major League Soccer club FC Dallas' stadium, Pizza Hut Park, prior to its opening in 2005, which were allowed to expire in January 2012.
- In October 2015, Pizza Hut signed sponsorship deals with the Dallas Mavericks, Dallas Stars, and American Airlines Center.
- In February 2018, Pizza Hut signed a sponsorship deal to be the official pizza sponsor for the National Football League.
- Pizza Hut sponsored the #14 Brad Jones Racing Holden ZB Commodore driven by Todd Hazelwood for both of the Darwin Triple Crown and Townsville 500 in 2021.
- In March 2022, Pizza Hut signed a sponsorship deal to be the official Quick Service Restaurant for the Supercars Championship.

=== Book It! ===
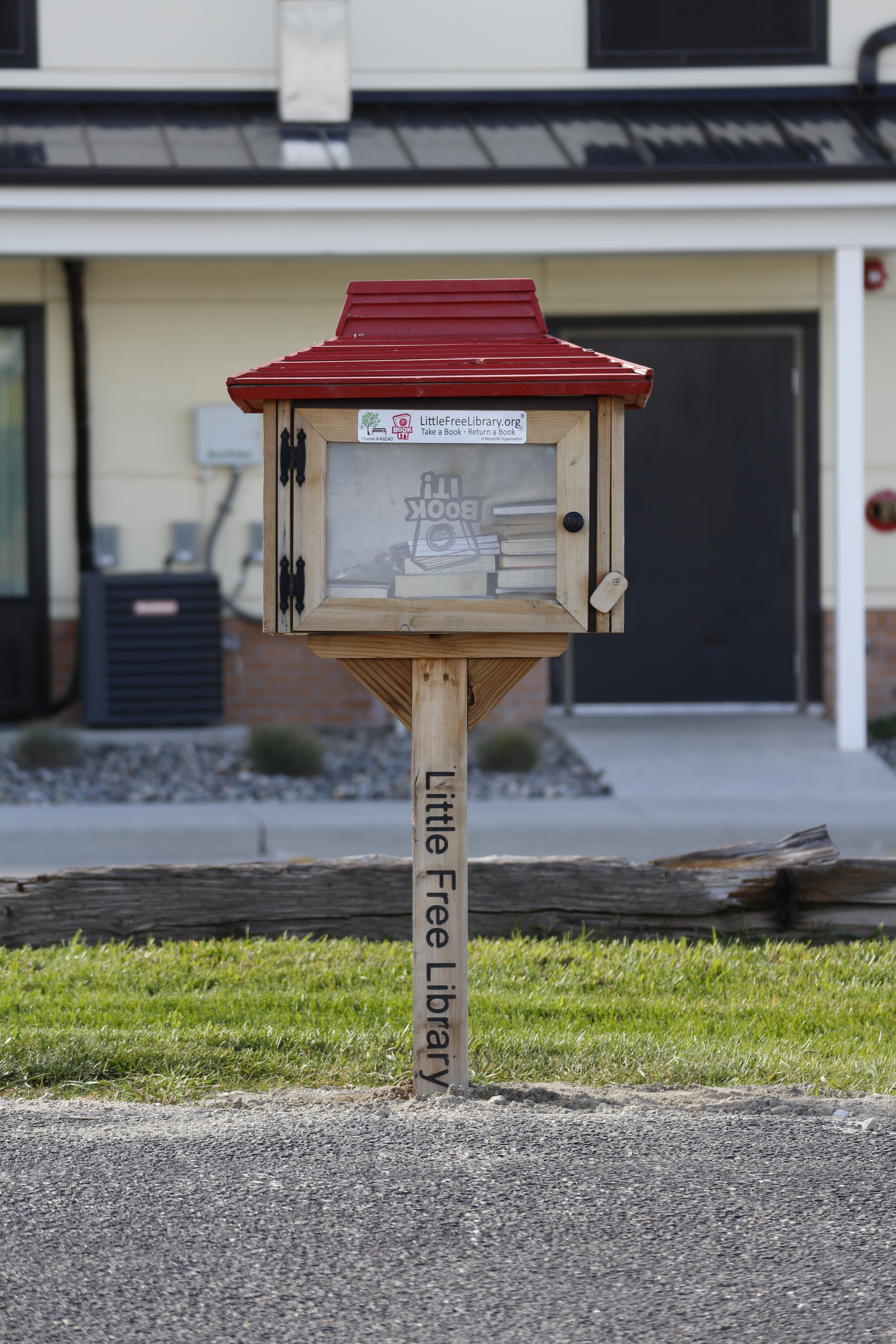
A Pizza Hut-themed Little Free Library in front of a Pizza Hut in Gillette, Wyoming

Pizza Hut has sponsored the Book It! reading-incentive program since it started in January 1985. Students who read books according to the goal set by the classroom teacher, in any month from October through March, are rewarded with a Pizza Hut certificate good for a free, one-topping Personal Pan Pizza; and the classroom whose students read the most books is rewarded with a pizza party. A 1987 report estimated that children participating in the program increased their reading from three books to nine books per month, on average. The success of the classroom-based reading encouragement program spurred local libraries to create their own reading program during the summer months, when school is not in session. Book It! was conceived in 1984 during a dinner with Art Gunther, President of Pizza Hut, and Bud Gates, SVP of Marketing at Pizza Hut, as a way to help Gunther's son read more.

The program has been criticized by some psychologists on the grounds it may lead to overjustification and reduce children's intrinsic interest in reading. Book It! was also criticized by the Campaign for a Commercial-Free Childhood in 2007 who described it as "one of corporate America's most insidious school-based brand promotions." A pamphlet produced by the group argued the program promoted junk food to a captive market, made teachers into promoters for Pizza Hut, and undermined parents by making visits to the chain an integral part of bringing up their children to be literate. However, a study of the program found participation in the program neither increased nor decreased reading motivation. The program's 25th anniversary was in 2010. The Book It! program in Australia ceased in 2002.

== Criticism ==
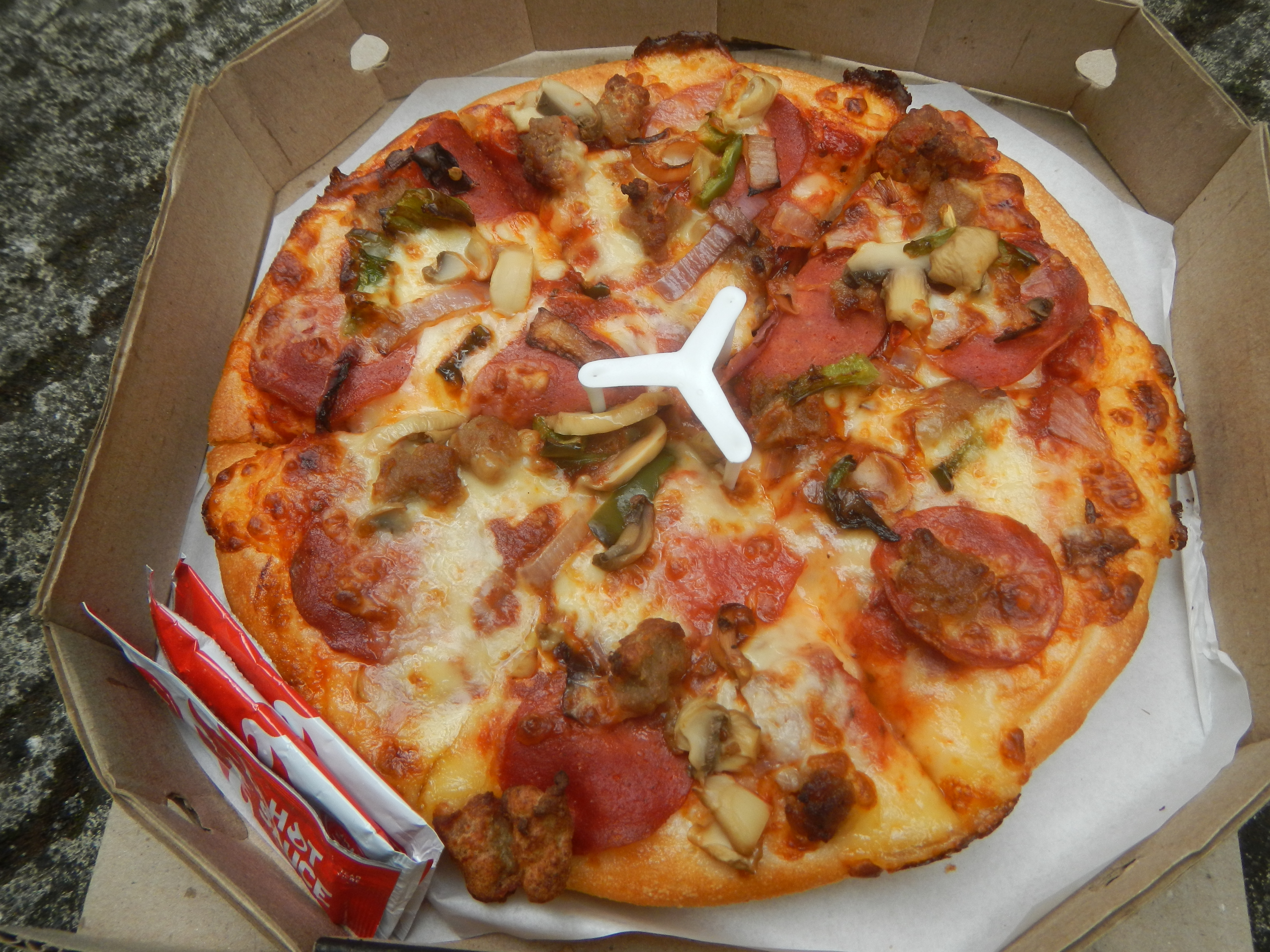
Pizza Hut pizzas contain high amounts of salt.

In October 2007, the UK lobby group "Consensus Action on Salt and Health" criticized Pizza Hut for high salt levels in its meals, noting that some items contained more than double the daily recommended amount for adults. A company spokesperson clarified that the surveyed pizzas were not part of family meal deals and stated that Pizza Hut had been working to reduce sodium since 2004.

Between 2008 and 2010, the company removed over 15% of salt across its menu to meet the Food Standards Agency 2010 targets.

In the United States, delivery drivers filed a class-action lawsuit in July 2014, alleging that Pizza Hut paid net wages below the minimum wage due to unreimbursed automobile expenses, violating the Fair Labor Standards Act of 1938.

Pizza Hut's attempt to dismiss the case in November 2015 was unsuccessful. In December 2016, the case, Linkovich v. Capital Pizza Huts, Inc., et al., was decided through arbitration, resulting in the payment of damages by the company.

== Animal welfare ==
Pizza Hut was the target of criticism by a World Animal Protection assessment in 2018, which claimed that it demonstrated "limited evidence" of concern with the humane handling of livestock in its operations.

In 2021, Yum! Brands, the owner of Pizza Hut, committed to using only cage-free eggs in the majority of its locations by 2026, and in all locations globally by 2030. The commitment came following the "largest public cage-free campaign" at that time.

== In film and popular culture ==
The 1987 comedy Spaceballs features a character named Pizza the Hutt, which is a parody of Jabba the Hutt made to sound like Pizza Hutt.

In the 1989 film Back to the Future Part II, Marty McFly and his family eat a "rehydrated" Pizza Hut pizza in the futuristic 2015.

The 1992 film Wayne's World features a scene where Wayne, played by Mike Myers, tells the audience that he will not be bought by corporate sponsors while eating a slice of Pizza Hut pizza.

There is a scene set in a Pizza Hut in the 2011 romantic comedy Just Go With It.

In the 2014 Teenage Mutant Ninja Turtles film, pizza boxes from Pizza Hut are prominently displayed in the group's sewer lair.

The film Slice of Life: The American Dream. In Former Pizza Huts, directed by Matthew Salleh and released in 2024, is a documentary about people who have converted former Pizza Hut buildings across America into a variety of new enterprises.

== See also ==
- List of pizza chains
- List of pizza chains of the United States
- List of pizza franchises
- List of pizza varieties by country
