= Wei Brian =

Chinese entrepreneur

Wei Brian is a skin care entrepreneur and CEO of Wei East and Wei Beauty Brands.

== Early life ==
Wei Brian was born in 1963 and lived in Wuhan, the capital city of the Hubei Province found in Central China. Brian earned a Bachelor of Science degree at Wuhan University. In 1985, Brian came to the United States to obtain her master's degree in Computer Science at Drexel University in Philadelphia, Pennsylvania.

== Career ==
In 2002 Brian began selling her Wei East line on HSN (Home Shopping Network).

In the beginning several HSN executives were cautious of the idea of using her sales idea. At first Wei Brian had almost no media training. She had a strong accent, and this gave her credibility that increased her sales volumes. Savio S. Chan (陳少宏, Pinyin: Chén Shàohóng) and Michael Zakkour, authors of China's Super Consumers: What 1 Billion Customers Want and How to Sell it to Them, wrote that Brian's "passion and authenticity came through."

According to Women's Wear Daily, in 2010 Brian partnered with Space NK stores in the United Kingdom and United States to introduce a 12-unit prestige treatment line called WEI Beauty. In 2009 Brian won the Asian Women in Business Entrepreneurial Leadership Award. Brian also launched We Help, a community outreach program dedicated to a variety of philanthropic causes. Its first priority was to support families faced with autism, through contributions to Autism Speaks and the Autism Treatment Center of America.

Featured in Oprah's "O" Magazine – March 2008 issue.

Featured in Forbes Asia article titled "China Fashion & Design 30", featuring 30 of the top influencers in China Fashion, Jewelry, Beauty, Architecture & Home Décor industries – December 2015 issue. Featured in December 2015 Forbes Asia
