= P'Zone =

Pizza-calzone hybrid

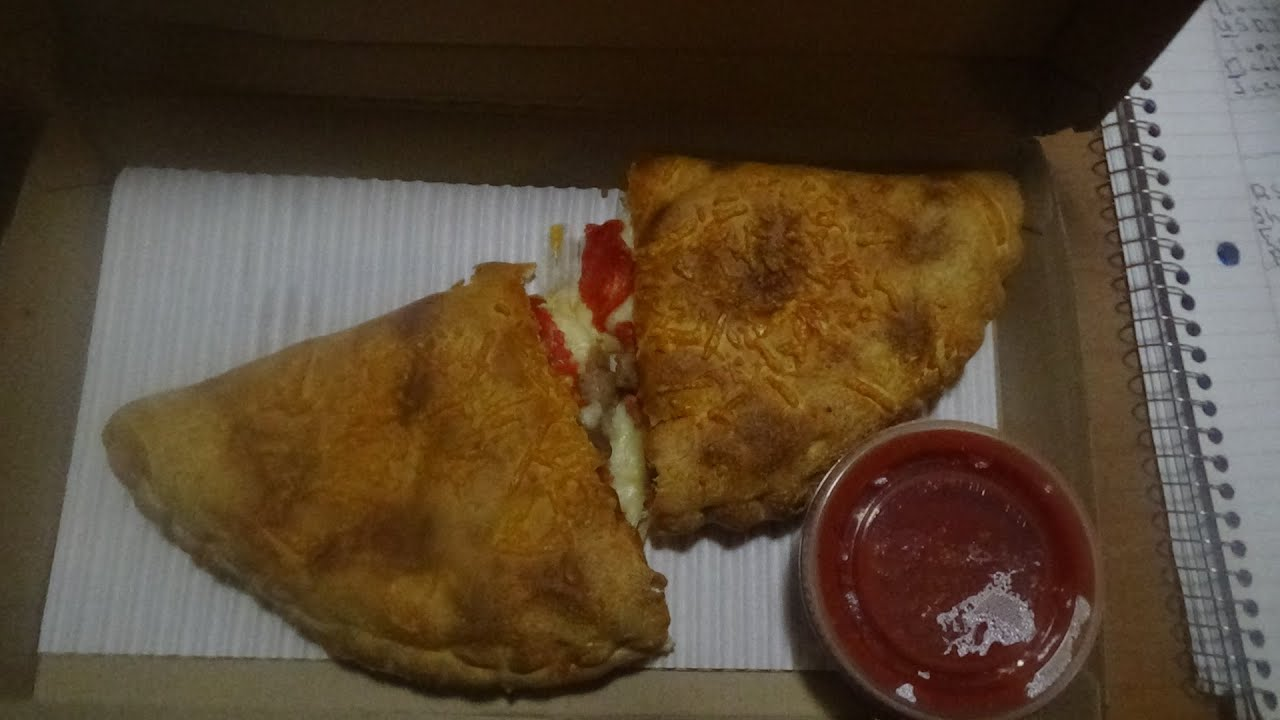
A P'Zone, cut in half, set inside a Pizza Hut box

The P'Zone (pronounced similarly to the Spanish word pezón, meaning "nipple") is a hybrid pizza-calzone sold by Pizza Hut, starting in 2002. The whole meal contains between 1,220 to 1,560 calories, which is 74.3% of the average daily caloric intake, and contains somewhere between 112% to twice the daily amount of sodium. Pizza Hut discontinued the P'Zone around 2011, but brought it back in March 2019 to coincide with March Madness.
