= China's Super Consumers =

2014 nonfiction on businesses

- First edition
- Author: Savio S. Chan, Michael Zakkour
- Original title: China's Super Consumers: What 1 Billion Customers Want and How to Sell It to Them
- Language: English
- Publisher: Wiley
- Publication date: September 22, 2014
- Media type: Print, e-book
- Pages: 240
- ISBN: 978-1118834749
- OCLC: 911205679

China's Super Consumers: What 1 Billion Customers Want and How to Sell It to Them is a 2014 nonfiction book by Savio S. Chan (陳少宏, Pinyin: Chén Shàohóng) and Michael A. Zakkour, published by John Wiley and Sons. The book discusses how U.S. businesses may market products to customers in mainland China.

== Authors ==
Chan is the president and CEO of the consulting company US China Partners Inc., and Zakkour is a principal at Tompkins International, serving in its China/APAC sector.

== Critical reception ==
Jack Maher, a Princeton in Asia fellow, wrote in the Asian Review of Books that China's Super Consumers did not factor into account the anti-corruption drives of Xi Jinping and the increase of Chinese domestic brands, and both aspects would require Western companies to take additional cautions.
