= Dongting station =

Dongting station may refer to:

- Dongting station (Wuhan Metro)
- Dongting station (Wuxi Metro)
