= Chu River and Han Street =

Street and river in Wuhan, China

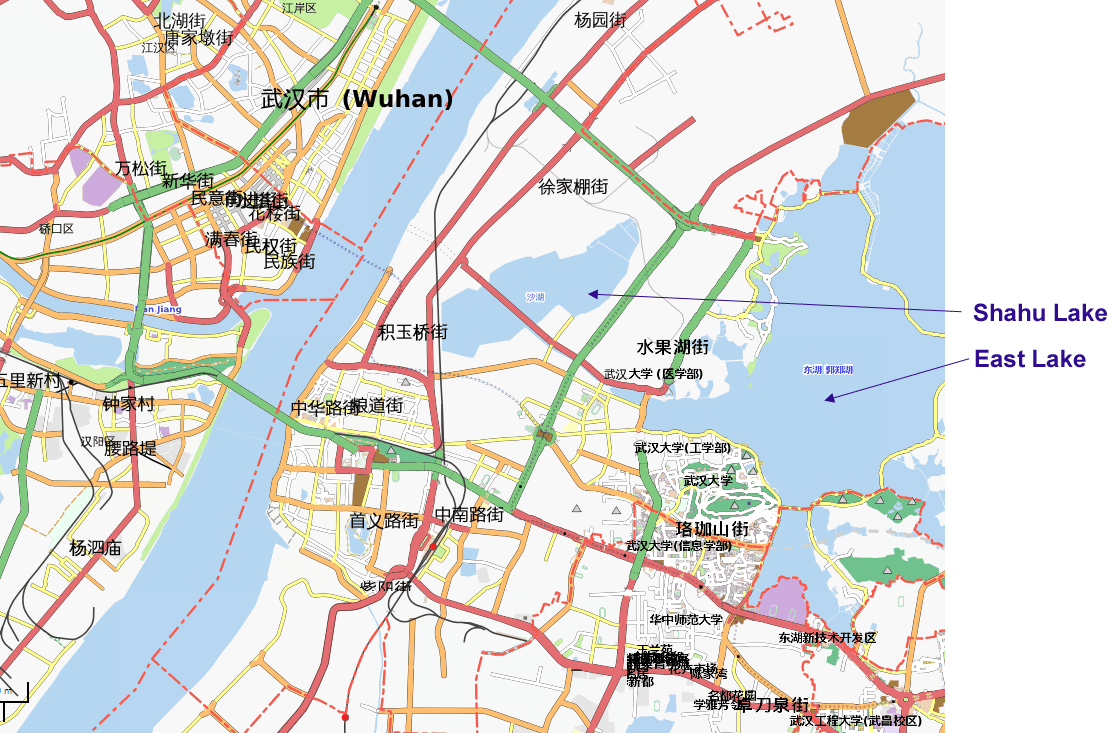
Street map of Wuhan showing East Lake and Shahu Lake: the Chu River and Han Street development is located between these two lakes

Chu River and Han Street (Chinese: 楚河汉街; pinyin: Chǔhé Hànjiē) is a street and a river in Wuhan, which is developed as a project of the Phase 1 of Wuhan Central Cultural Zone.

It marks the launching project of the Dadong River Ecological Water Network in Wuhan and celebrates the centennial of the Xinhai Revolution which took place in 1911 in China. Chu River and Han Street, with a total floor space of 210,000 square meters, officially opened for business on 30 September 2011.

Wuhan Central Cultural Zone is advantageously situated in downtown between East Lake and Shahu Lake in Wuchang District—a geometric center in the city of Wuhan. It covers 1.8 square kilometers with a floor space of 3.4 million square meters. Wanda Group invested RMB 50 billion in this project, which encompasses tourist attractions, business, commercial and living accommodation.

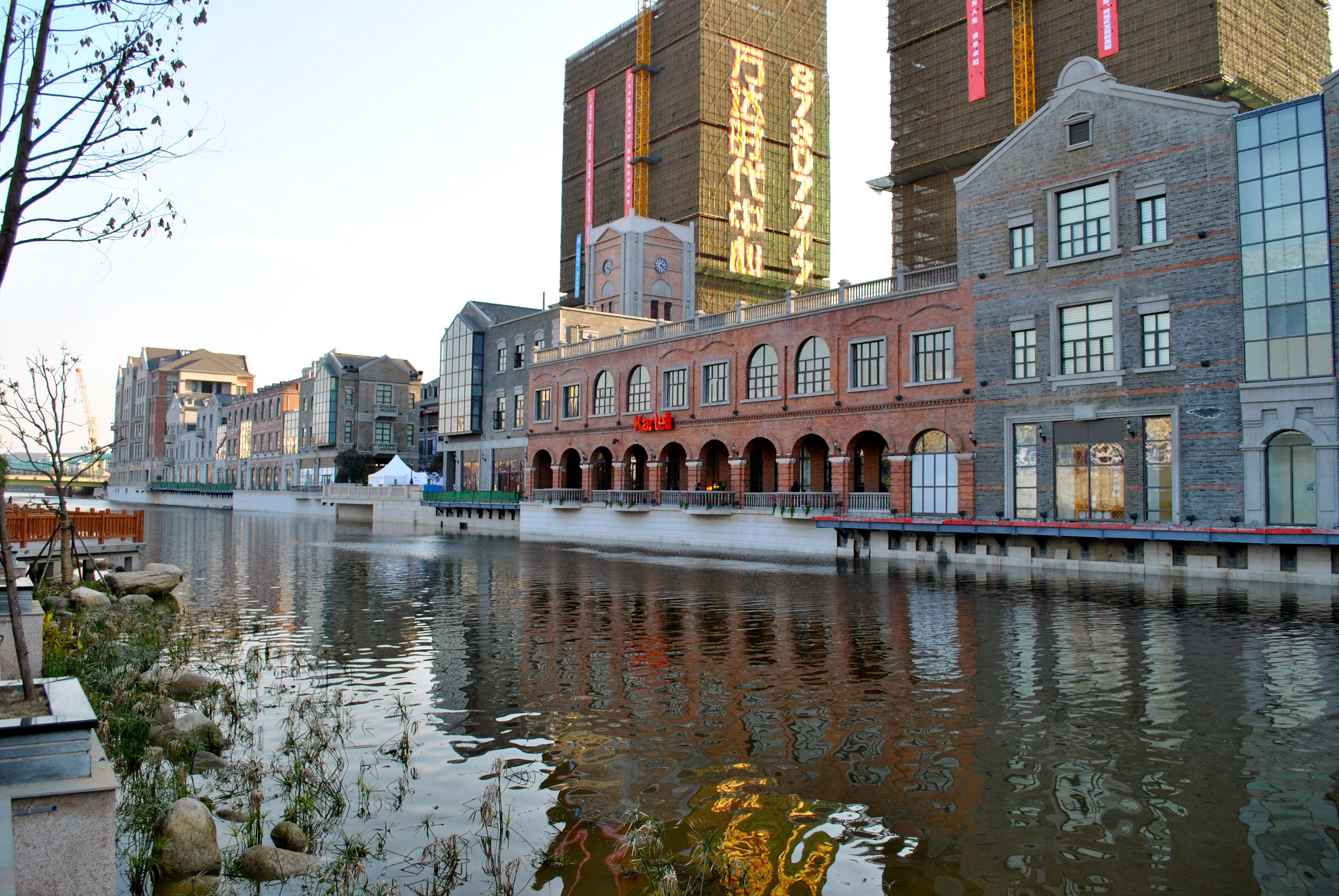
Han street looking from across the Chu river

== Chu River ==
Chu River, 2.2 kilometers in length, connects East Lake and Shahu Lake in Wuhan. It is the first of several controlling projects of 6 lakes’ water network approved by State Council of China. Chu River is 40–70 meters wide, so becomes 150 meters in width including landscaping and road. The riverside road is lined with trees, enhancing its attractiveness and recreational credentials. There are four bridges over Chu river. They are named after a name prize.

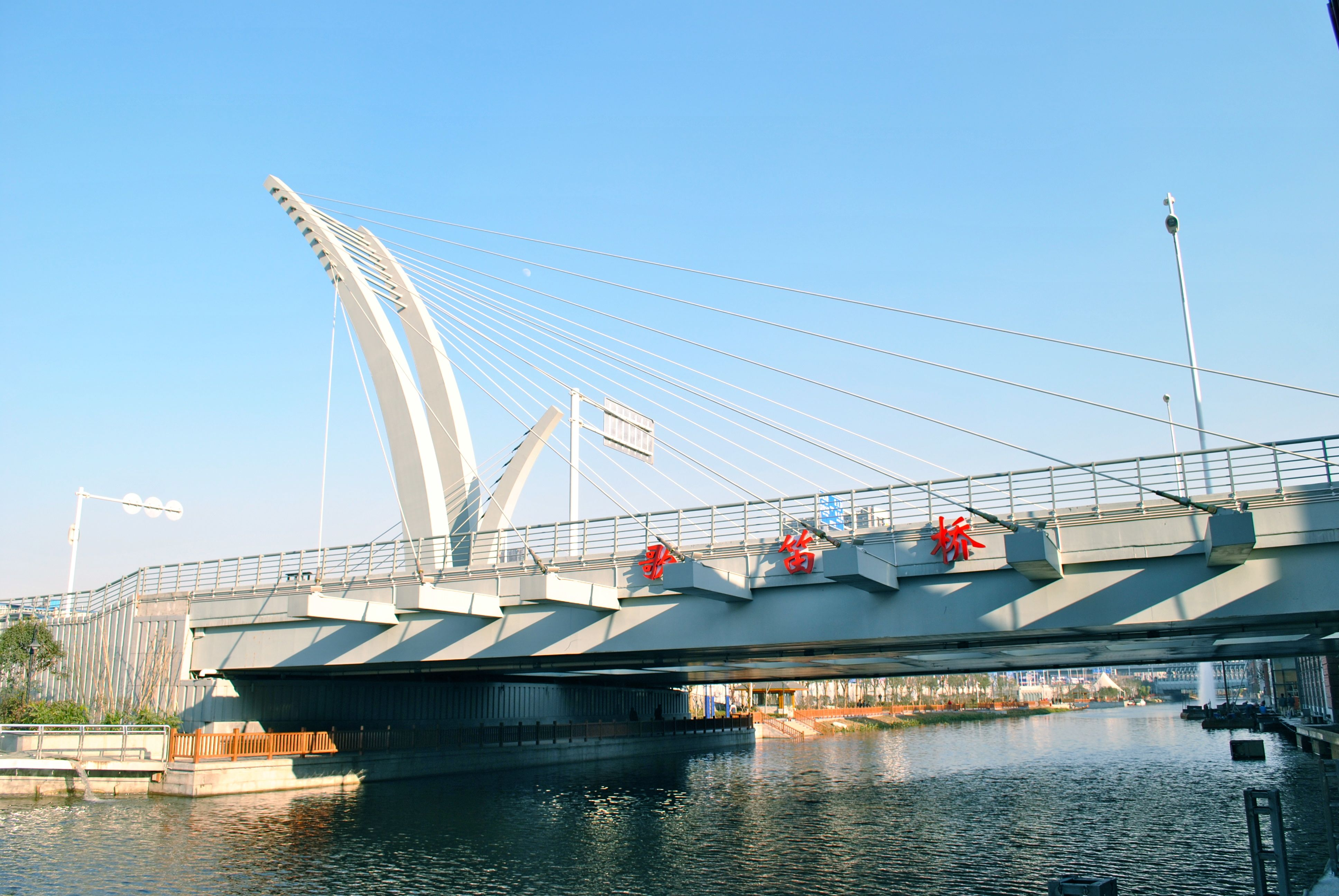
Gedi bridge (Song and flute, literally)

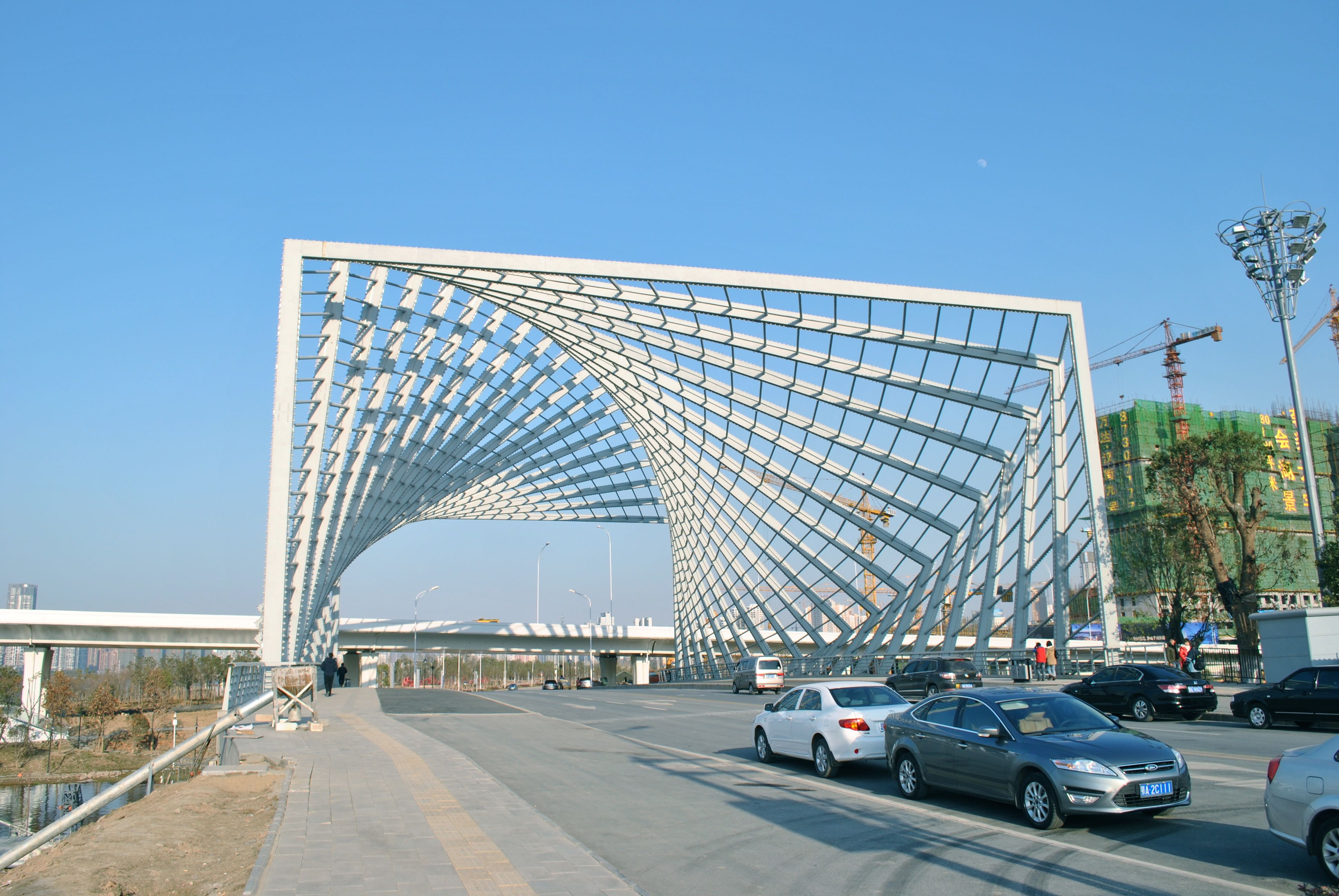
Yanxia bridge (Twilight mist and clouds)

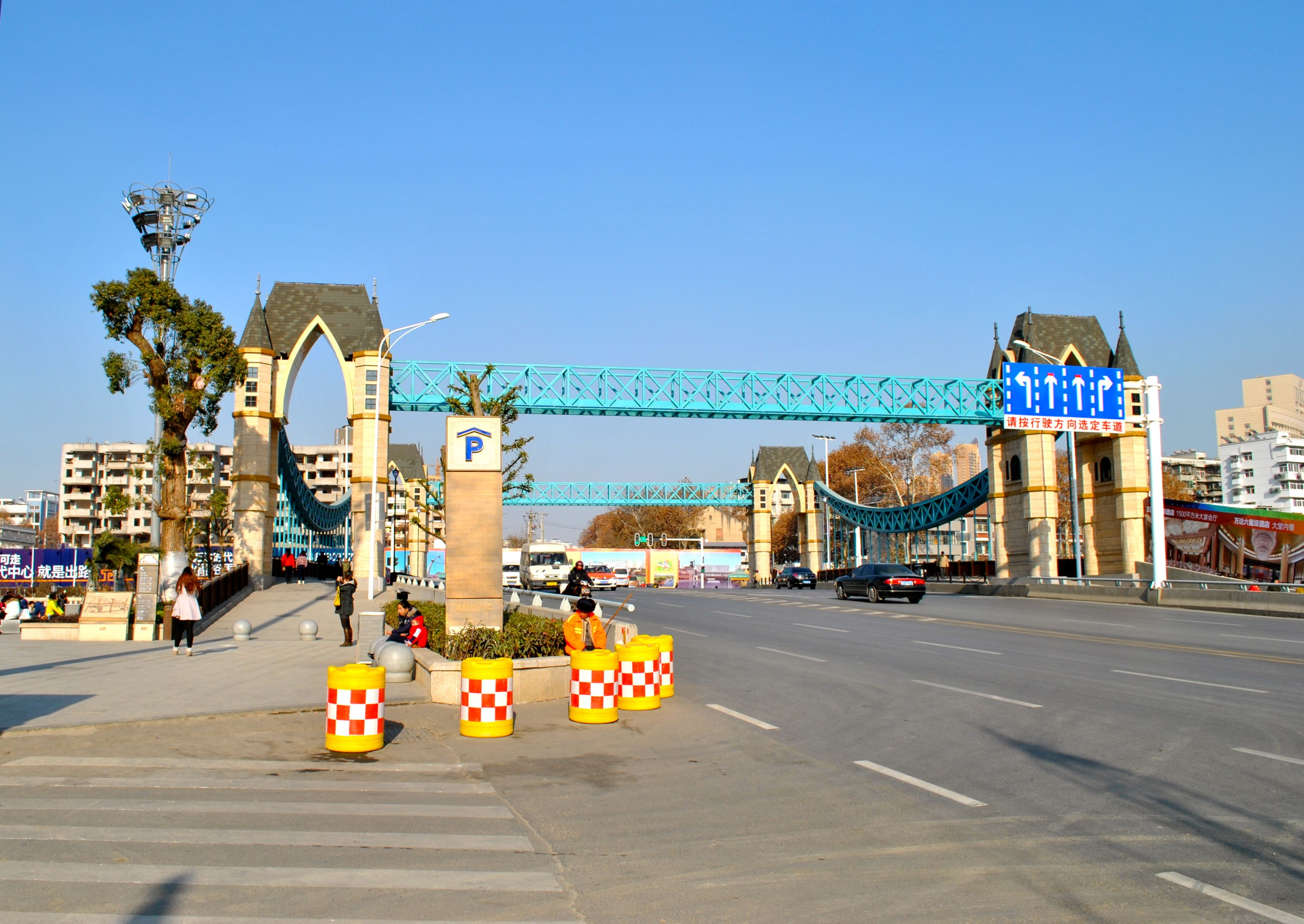
Fangying bridge (Eagle-release)

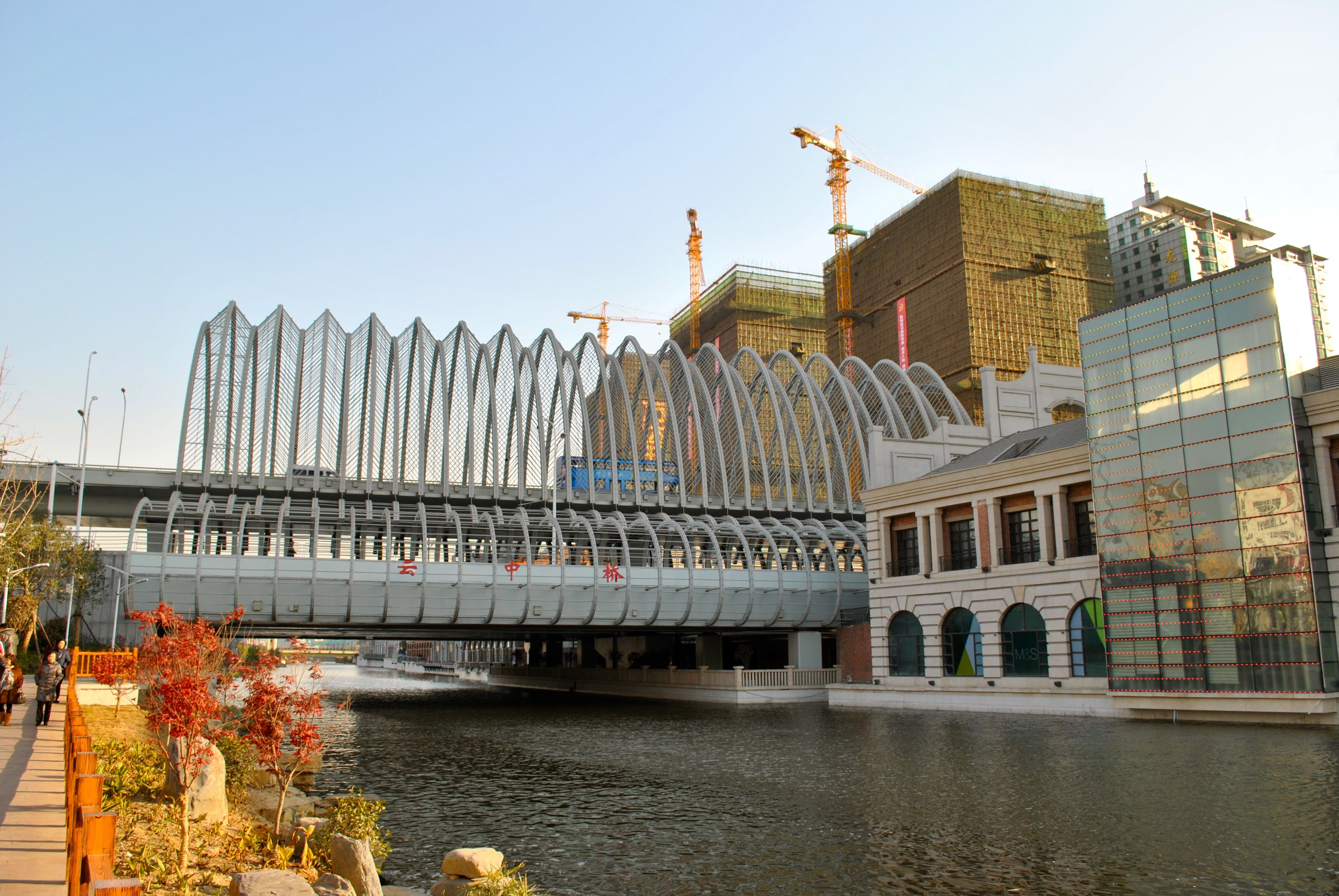
Yunzhong bridge (In the cloud)

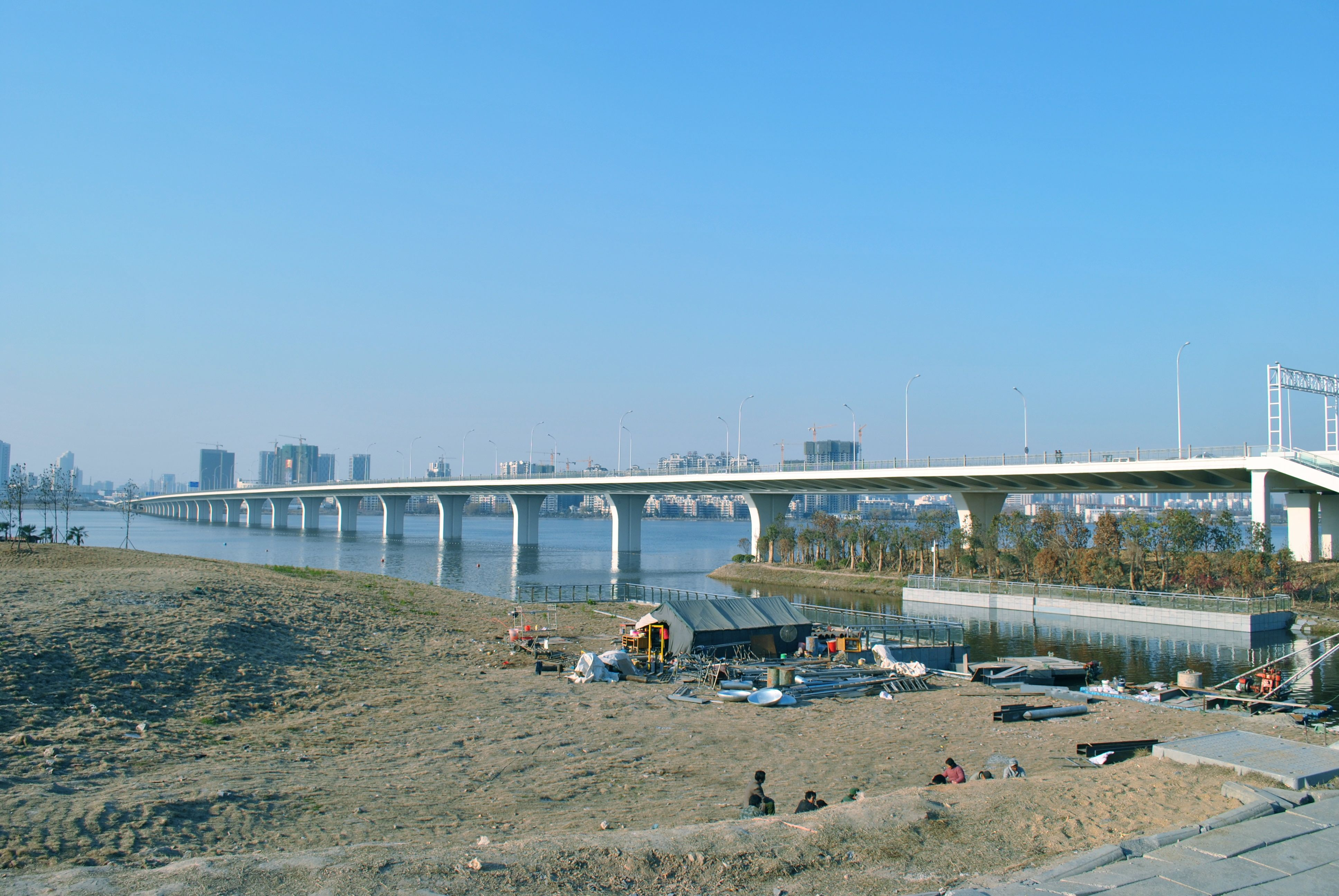
The nearby Shahu bridge

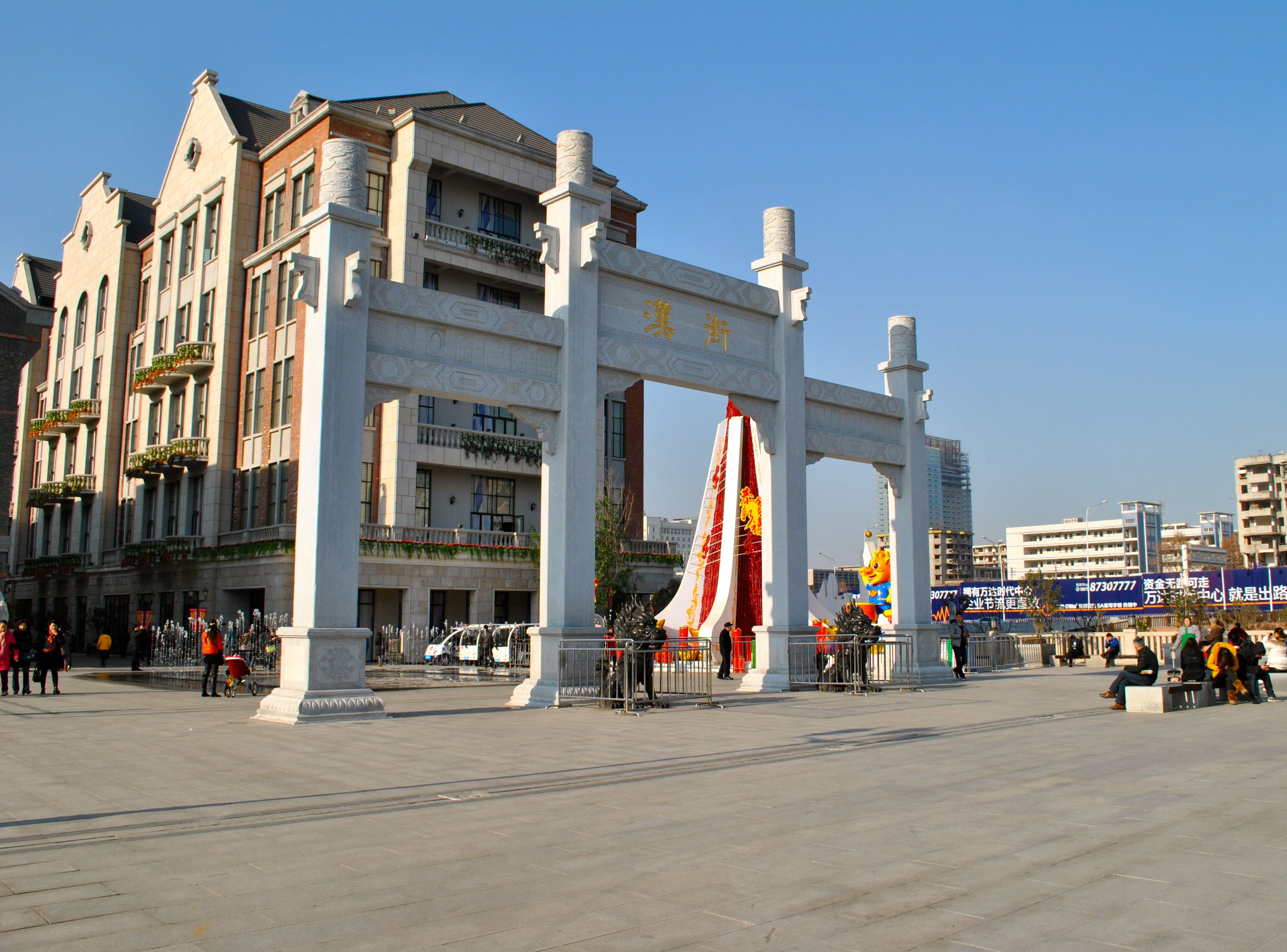
Entrance to Han street.

== Han Street ==
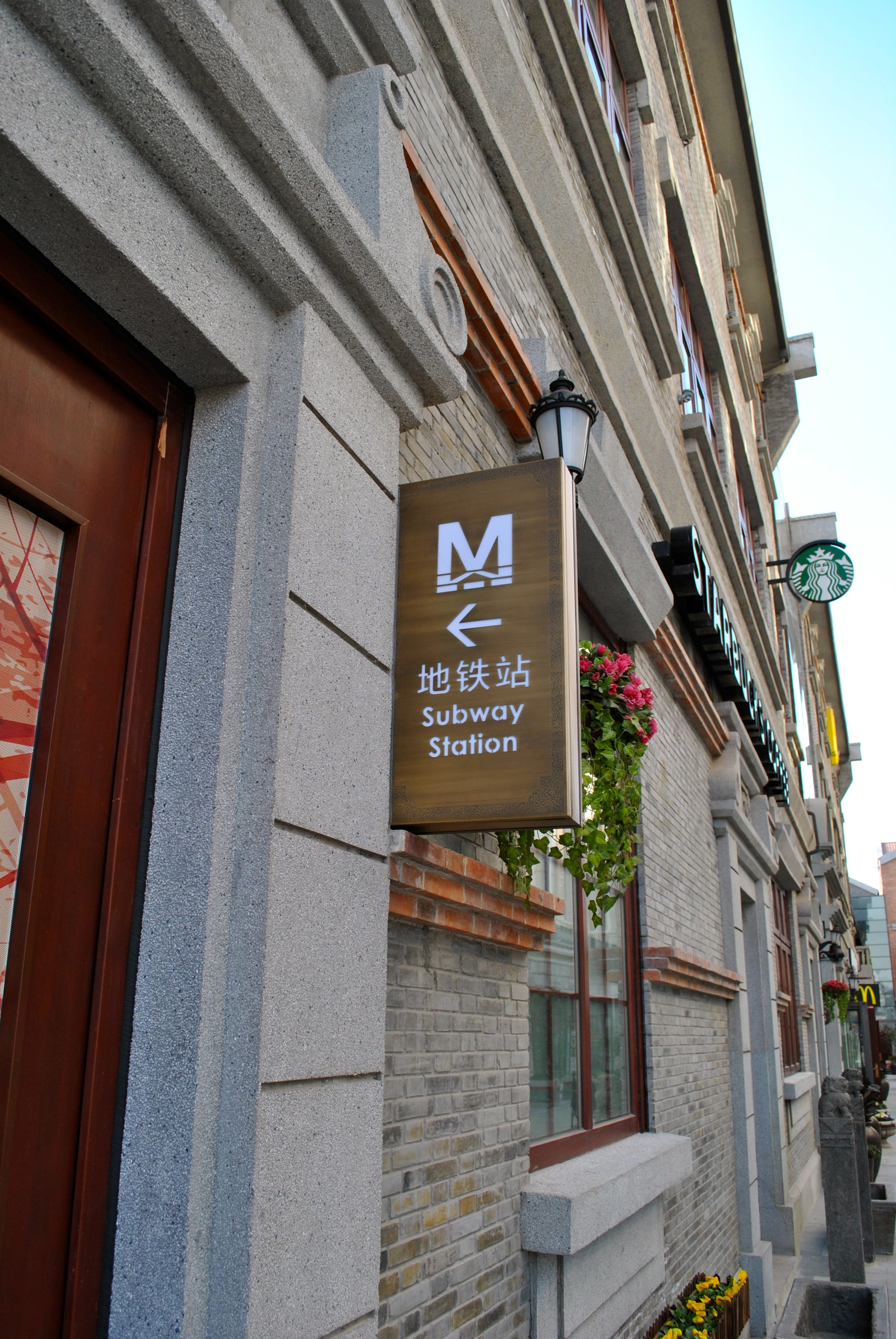
Subway head house for Wuhan Metro

Han Street runs along the south bank of the Chu River. Stretching 1500 meters and covers 210,000 square meters, Han Street houses shopping malls, restaurants, cultural and recreational sites. Roughly 200 businesses are located on this street. Line 4, Wuhan Metro has a station nearby under the same Chinese name, the Chuhe Hanjie Station.

== Project Scale ==
Han Street is 1500 meters in length and by far the longest commercial pedestrian street in China.

== Architecture Style ==
Han Street has a unique architectural style, blending tradition and modernity. Most of its architecture recreates the style of the Republic of China period, marked by red-and-grey bricks, delicate architraves, black gates, bronze door rings, shikumen, brick-paved lanes and old-fashioned wooden windows. However, modern and European style building are included among the old-style architectures.

== Culture Projects ==
Eight culture projects are set up along Chu River and Han Street.

=== Han Show theater ===
At the east end of Han street, there is a Han Show theater. It is the collaborative product of Wanda and Franco Dragone Entertainment Company with an investment of RMB 2.5billion. The creative idea of Han Show comes directly from Franco Dragone, a renowned figure of stage art, who created and directed several famous stage shows such as O show, La Nouba, The Dream, and the House of Dancing Water.

Stufish Ltd were commissioned by the Dalian Wanda Group to design the theatre housing Franco Dragones Han Show in October 2010. The 'Red Lantern' Han Show Theatre building concept design was created by London architect practice, Steven Chilton Architects during a period of commissioned work for Stufish Ltd in November 2010. Chilton drew his inspiration from the form and structural principles evident in the design of traditional Chinese Lanterns.. Stufish Ltd used the 'Red Lantern' concept as the basis of their design for the final theatre building. The team responsible for developing the building design was led by Chilton (joined Stufish in January 2011) working alongside Stufish Partner Mark Fisher who led the design of the theaters innovative auditorium. Fisher was director of art for the opening ceremonies of the Beijing Olympic Games, and the Asian Games in Guangzhou. Whilst working for Marks Barfield Architects (1997–2010) Chilton worked on the design of many award-winning projects including Millbank Millennium Pier and The London Eye.

Design Team Credits:

Theatre Architect: Stufish Ltd, Concept Design Architect: Steven Chilton Architects, Architect for theatre auditorium: Mark Fisher, Architect for theatre building: Steven Chilton, Project Designer : Jenny Melville, Design Team: Dan Dodds, Chihming Huang, Austin Hutchison, Jasna Jevermovic, Ric Lipson, Adrian Mudd, Alicia Tkacz, Sharon Toong, Stefan Tribe, MAciej Woroniecki,

Theatre Technical Advisor: Franco Dragone Entertainment Company, Theatre Consultant: Theatre Projects Consultants, Acoustics consultant: Jaffe Holden Acoustics, Theatre Site Technical Coordinator:Sandman Associates, Local Design Institute: Guangzhou Pearl River Foreign Investment Architectural Designing Institute co. ltd.

=== Movie Culture Park ===
Wanda Group invested RMB 3.5 billion in building the world’s first indoor movie culture park at the west end of Han Street. It covers 60,000 square meters. Mark Fisher was inspired by the essence of Han culture—bronze chime bell for the design of this park. There are seven entertaining programs that combine movies and technologies including 4D cinema theater, 5D cinema theater, flying cinema theater, interactive cinema theater, experiment cinema theater, space cinema theater and magical restaurant.

=== Largest Cinema in China ===
Wanda Cinema, in the center of a block of Han Street, has 15 screens and 3000 seats, with a 3D movie theater and IMAX theater.

=== Five Squares in Memory of Great Names in History ===
Han Street has five squares named after well-known figures in Hubei Province. They are “Qu Yuan Square”, “Zhaojun Square”, “Square of Bosom Friends (Yu Boya, Zhong Ziqi)”, “Square of Medical Saint (Li Shizhen)” and Square of Tai Chi Master (Zhang Sanfeng). Each square features a statue of the famous person.

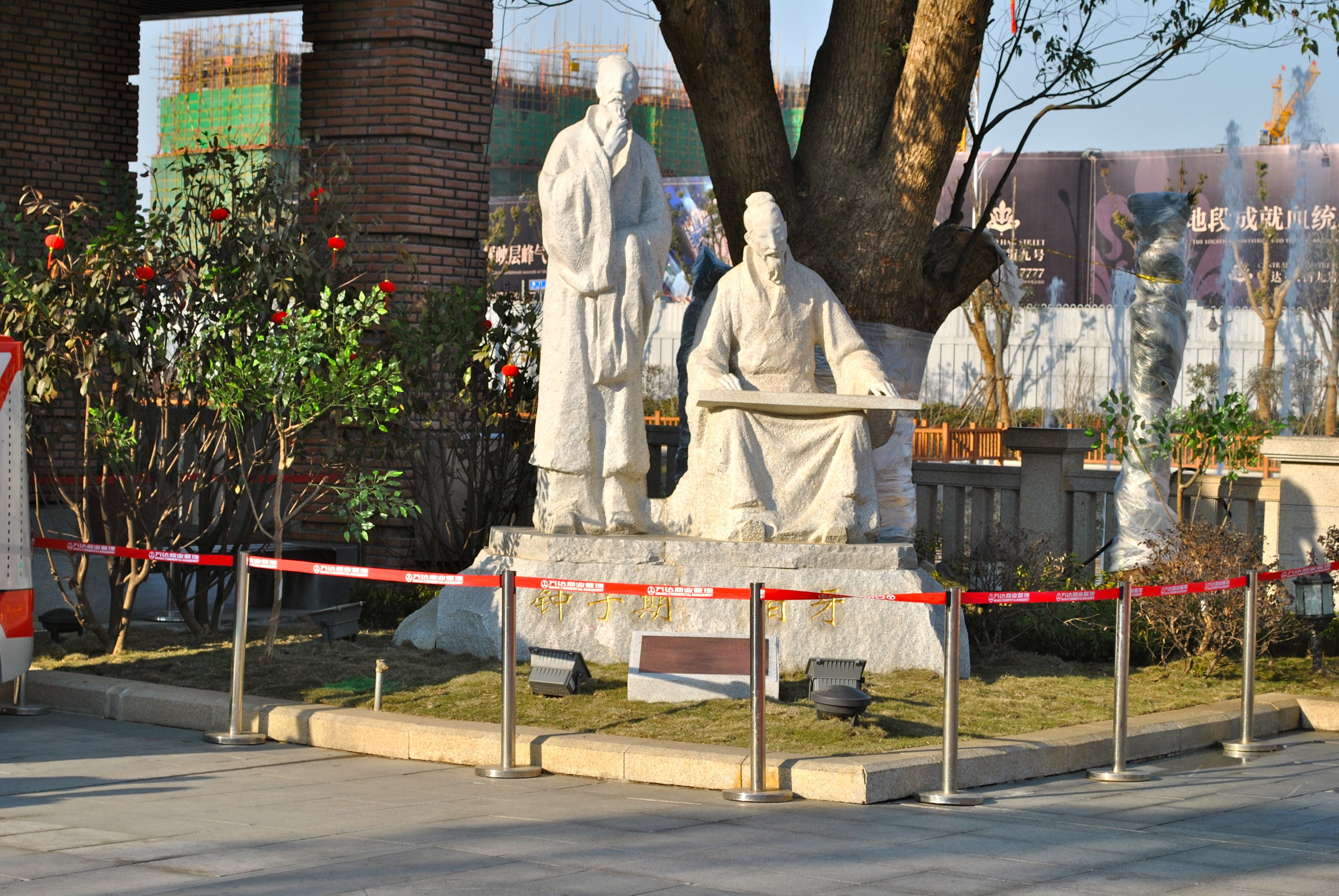
Square of Bosom Friends

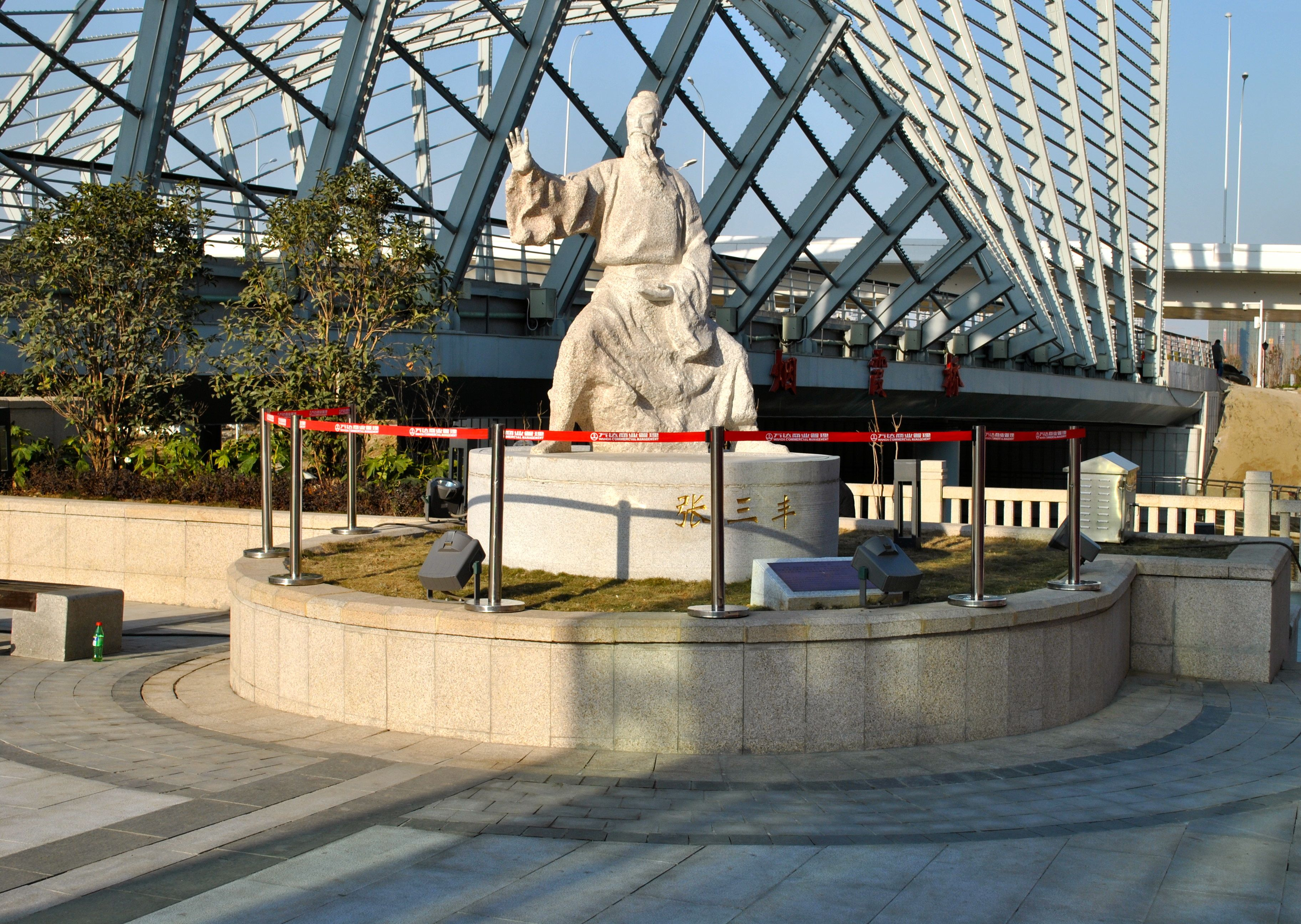
Square of Tai Chi Master

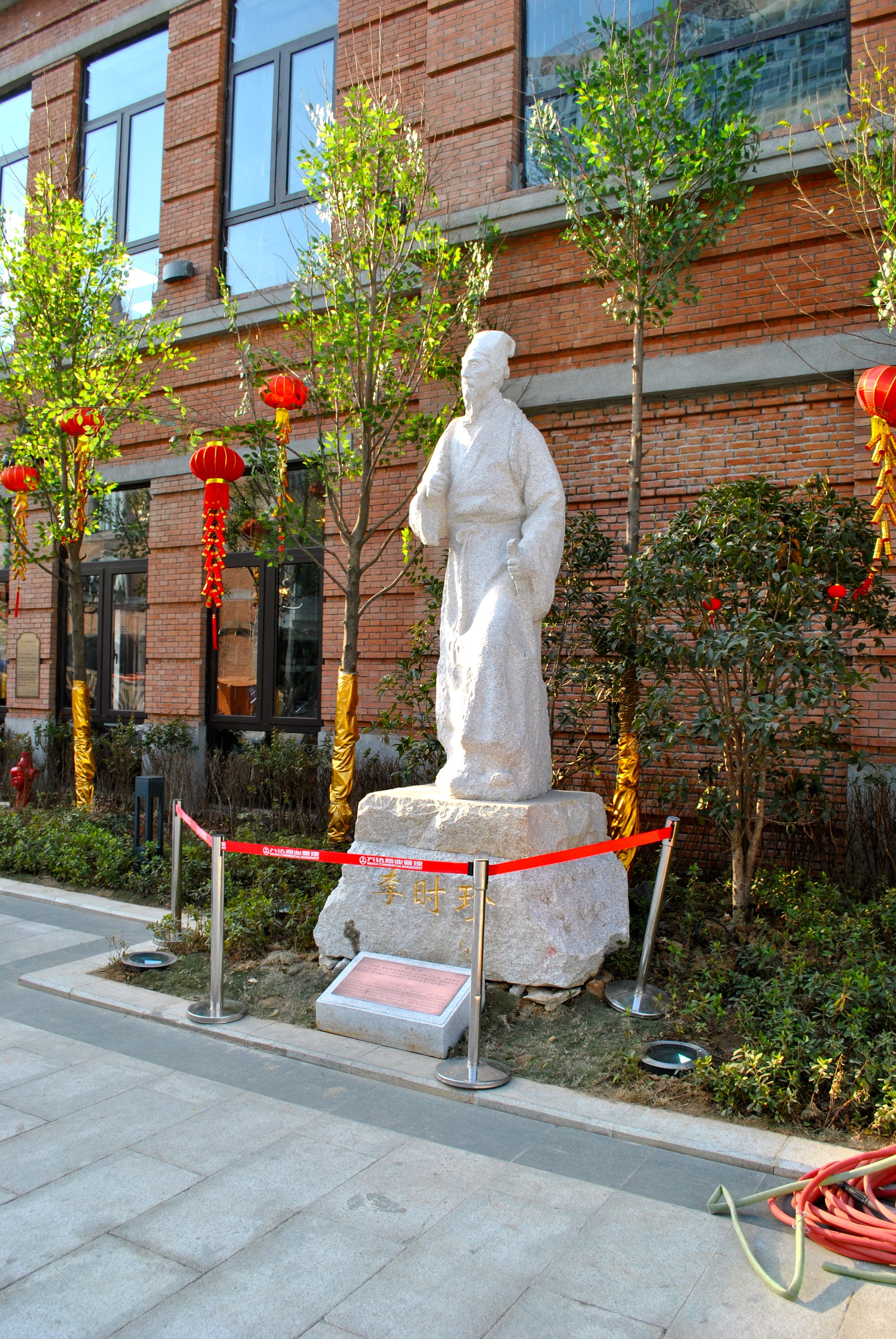
Square of Medical Saint

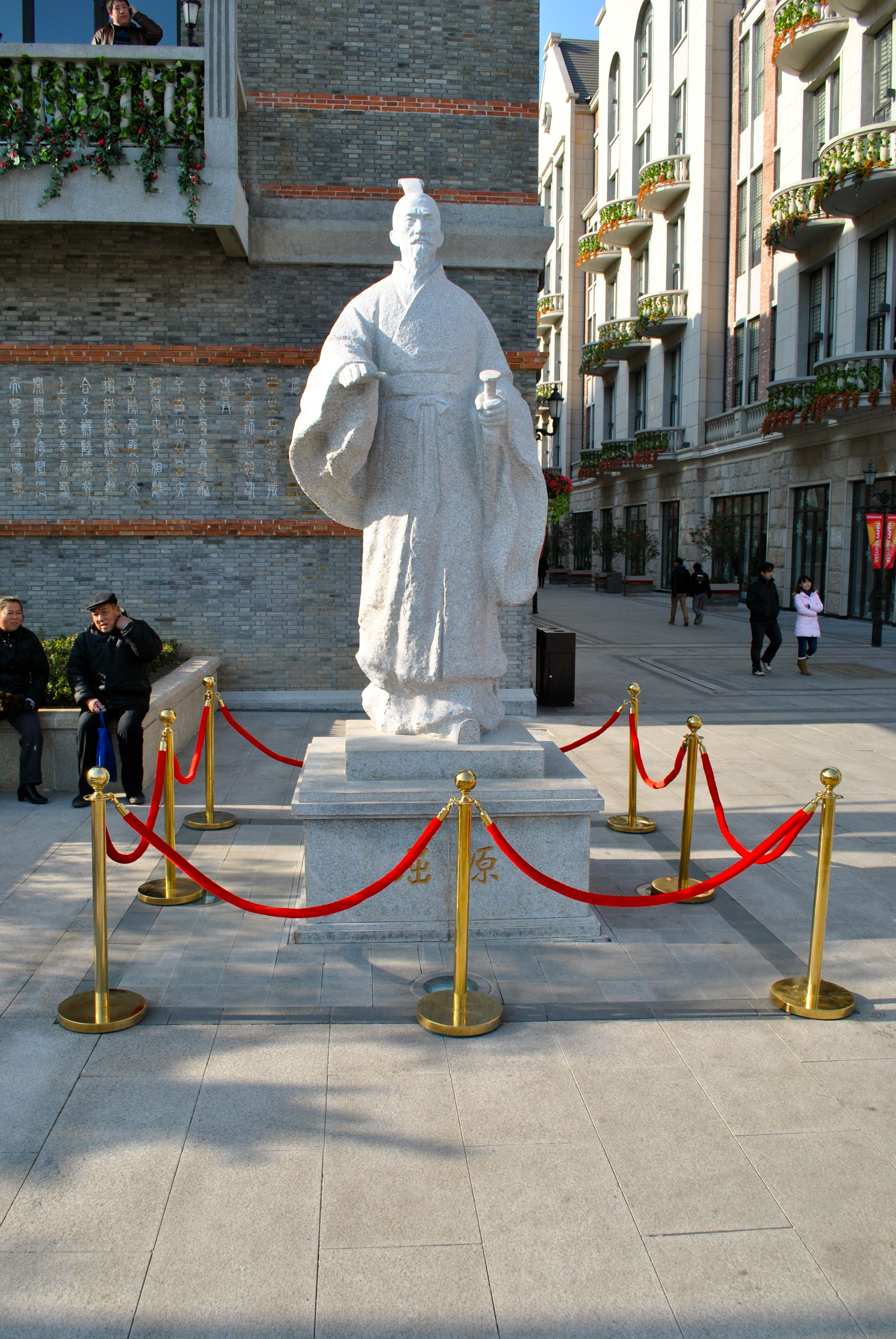
Qu Yuan Square

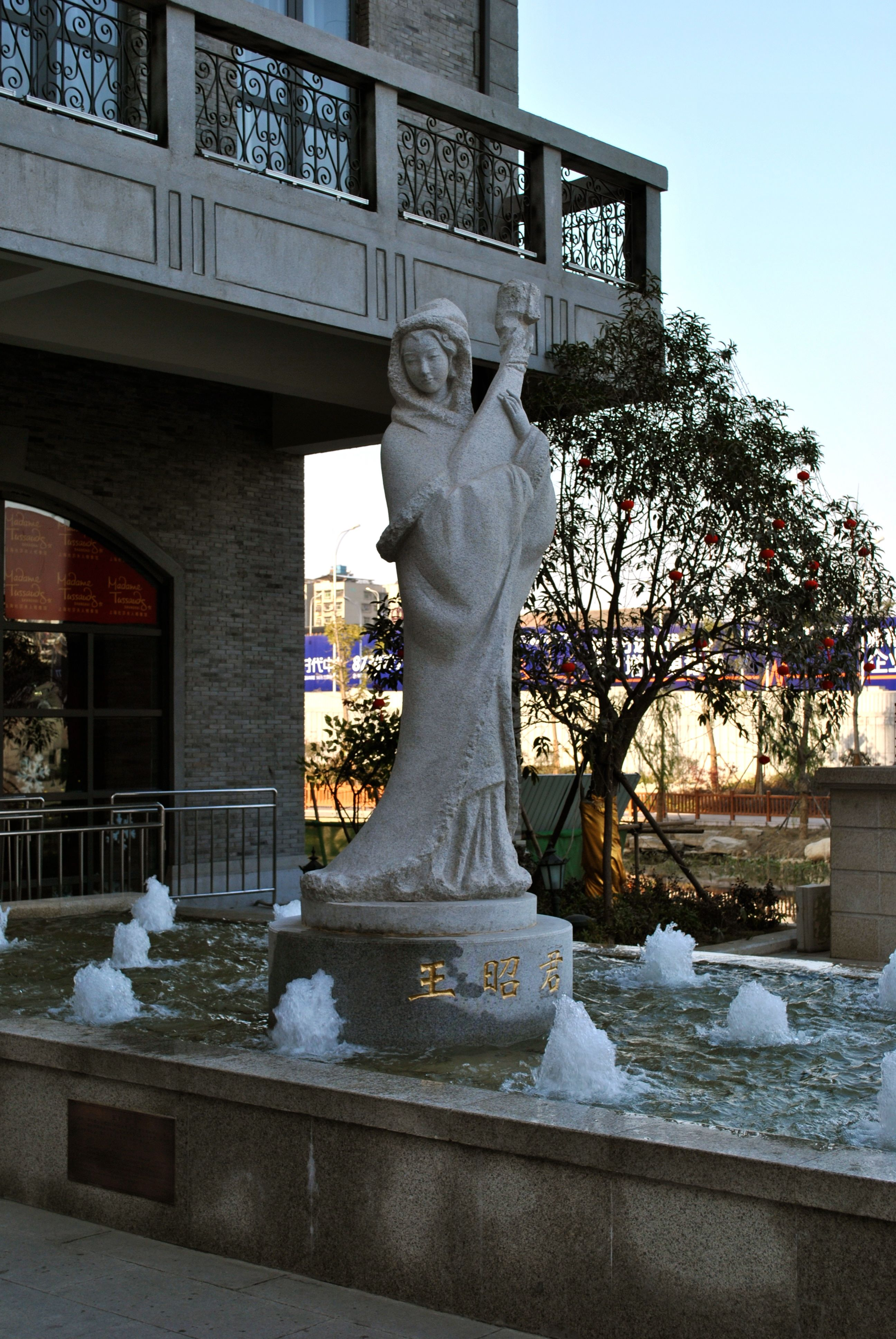
Zhaojun Square

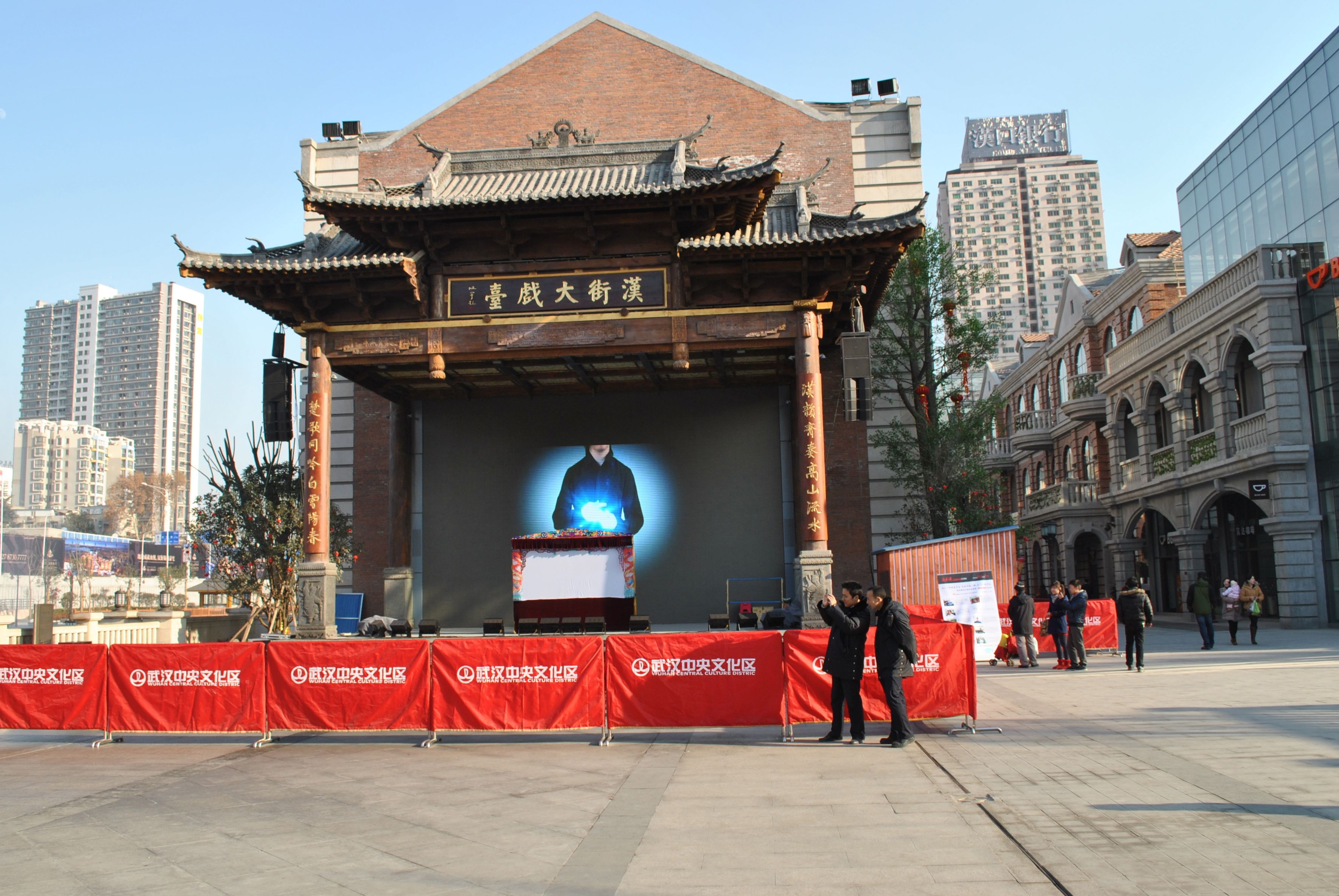
Public Performance Stage

=== Public Performance Stage ===
At the east side of the Square of Bosom Friends there is a stage for free of charge public performances. It is constructed with artificial antique wood with an LED screen in the background. During public holidays, traditional Chinese operas shows will be staged.

=== Madame Tussauds ===
Madame Tussauds is a renowned wax museum based in London, with branches in a number of major cities. Madame Tussauds on Han Street is the second one in mainland China.

=== Wenhua Bookshop ===
Wenhua, a brand in the Chinese book industry, opened the largest bookshop in Hubei Province on Han Street, covering 5,000 square meters.

=== Zhenggang Art Gallery ===
Zhenggang Art Gallery is set up by the painter Xiong Zhenggang. It offers high-end and creative paintings as well as aromatic and mellow coffee.

== Commercial Achievements ==
Han Street houses more than 200 first-rate domestic and foreign businesses ranging from shopping, dining, culture, to entertainment. Han Street hosts flagship stores of many global fashion brands such as Zara, H&M, C&A, GAP, Muji, M&S, Uniqlo, Map and UR. Wanda Plaza, located in the center of a block of the street is due to open in 2012 with a floor space of 150,000 square meters, housing more than sixty luxury brands. It is the flagship store of all Wanda plazas in China. (Wanda Plaza is a leading brand of HOPSCA of China invested by Dalian Wanda Group. Nearly 100 Wanda Plazas are in business or under construction in more than 50 cities in China.)
