= Chuhe Hanjie station =

Subway station in Wuhan, China

Chuhe Hanjie 楚河汉街 metro
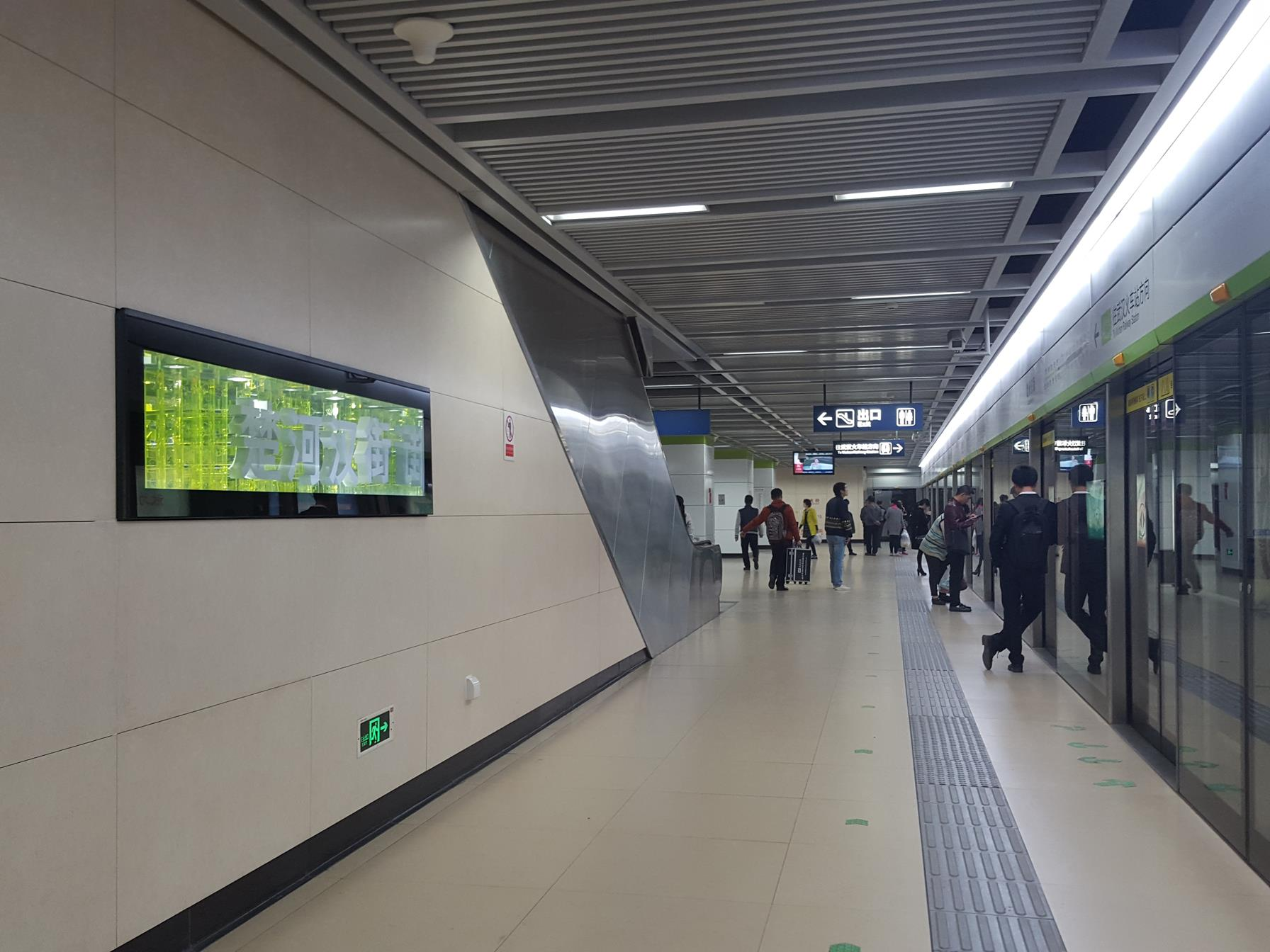

General information
- Location: Wuchang District, Wuhan, Hubei; China
- Coordinates: 30.5562°N 114.33582°E
- Operated by: Wuhan Metro Co., Ltd
- Line: Line 4
- Platforms: 2 (1 island platform)

Construction
- Structure type: Underground

History
- Opened: December 28, 2013 (Line 4)

Services
Preceding station	Wuhan Metro	Following station
Hongshan Square towards Bailin	Line 4	Qingyuzui towards Wuhan Railway Station
Location

Chuhe Hanjie Station (Chinese: 楚河汉街站) is a station of Line 4 of Wuhan Metro. It entered revenue service on December 28, 2013. It is located in Wuchang District. It is serving the shopping district under the same Chinese name, Chu River and Han Street.

== Station layout ==
G	Entrances and Exits	Exits A-D
B1	Concourse	Faregates, Station Agent
B2	Westbound	← Line 4 towards Bailin (Hongshan Square)
B2	Island platform, doors will open on the left
B2	Eastbound	Line 4 towards Wuhan Railway Station (Qingyuzui) →

== Gallery ==
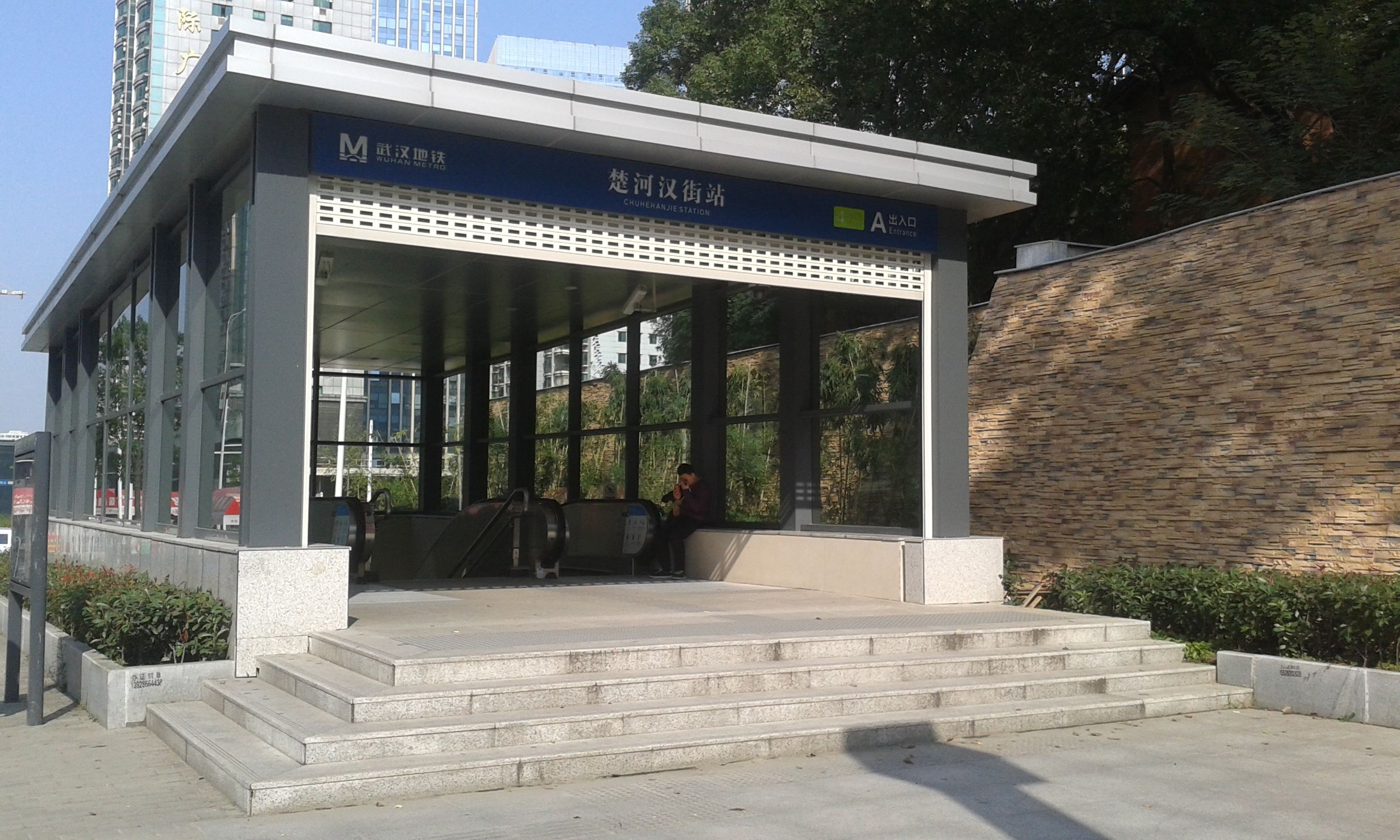
Entrance A

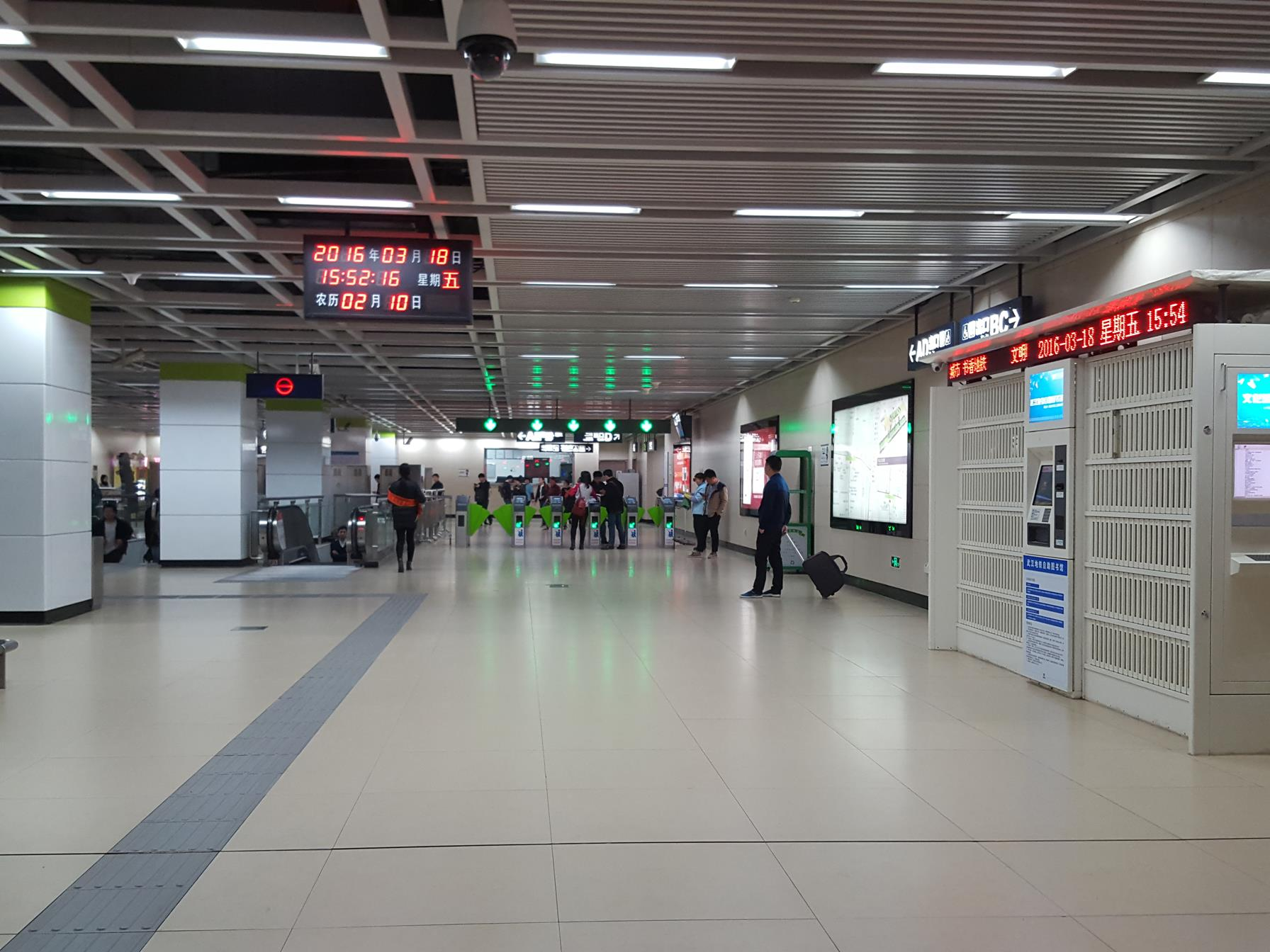
Concourse

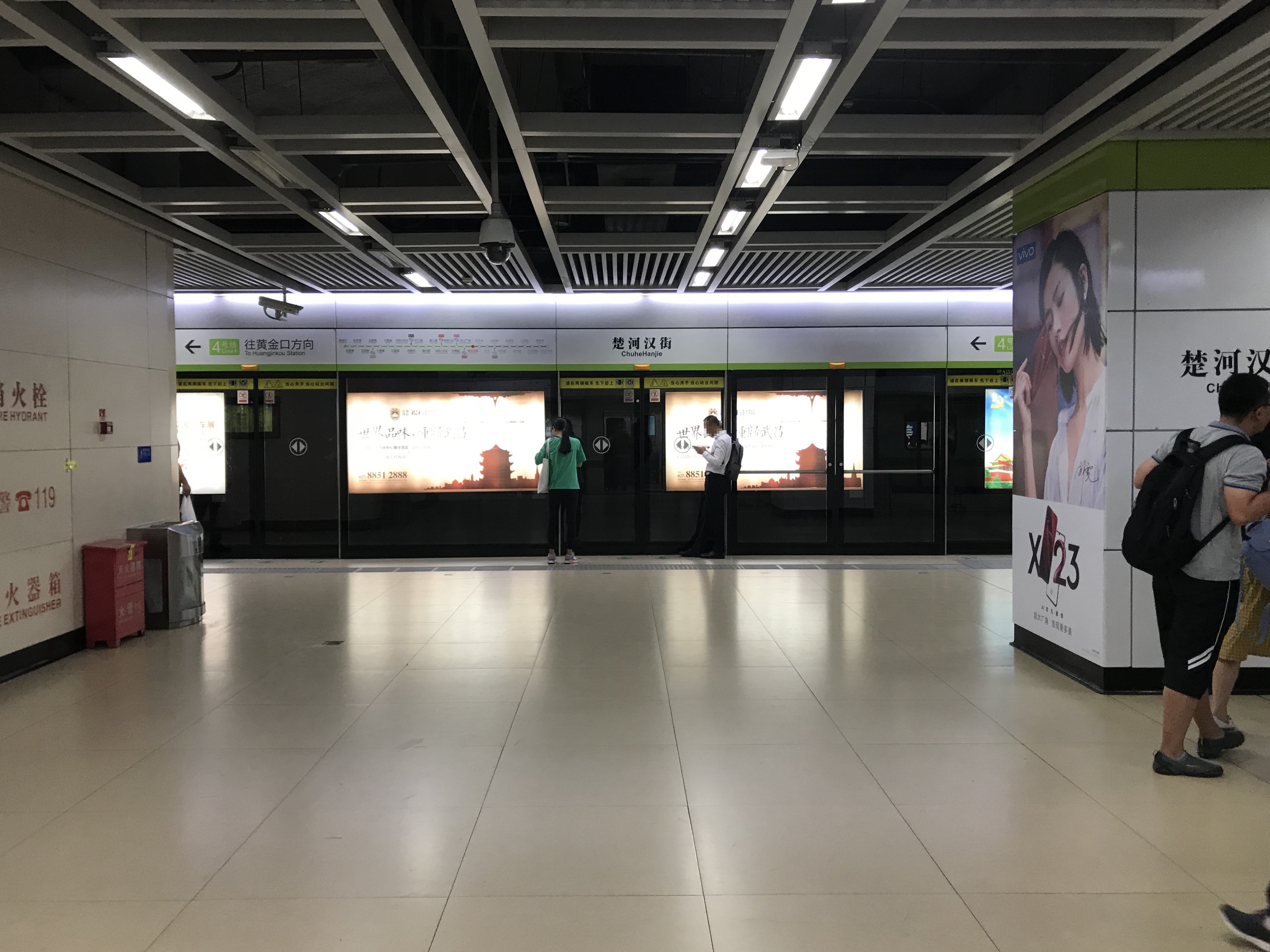
Platform
