= Dongting station (Wuhan Metro) =

Metro station in Wuhan, China

Dongting 东亭 metro
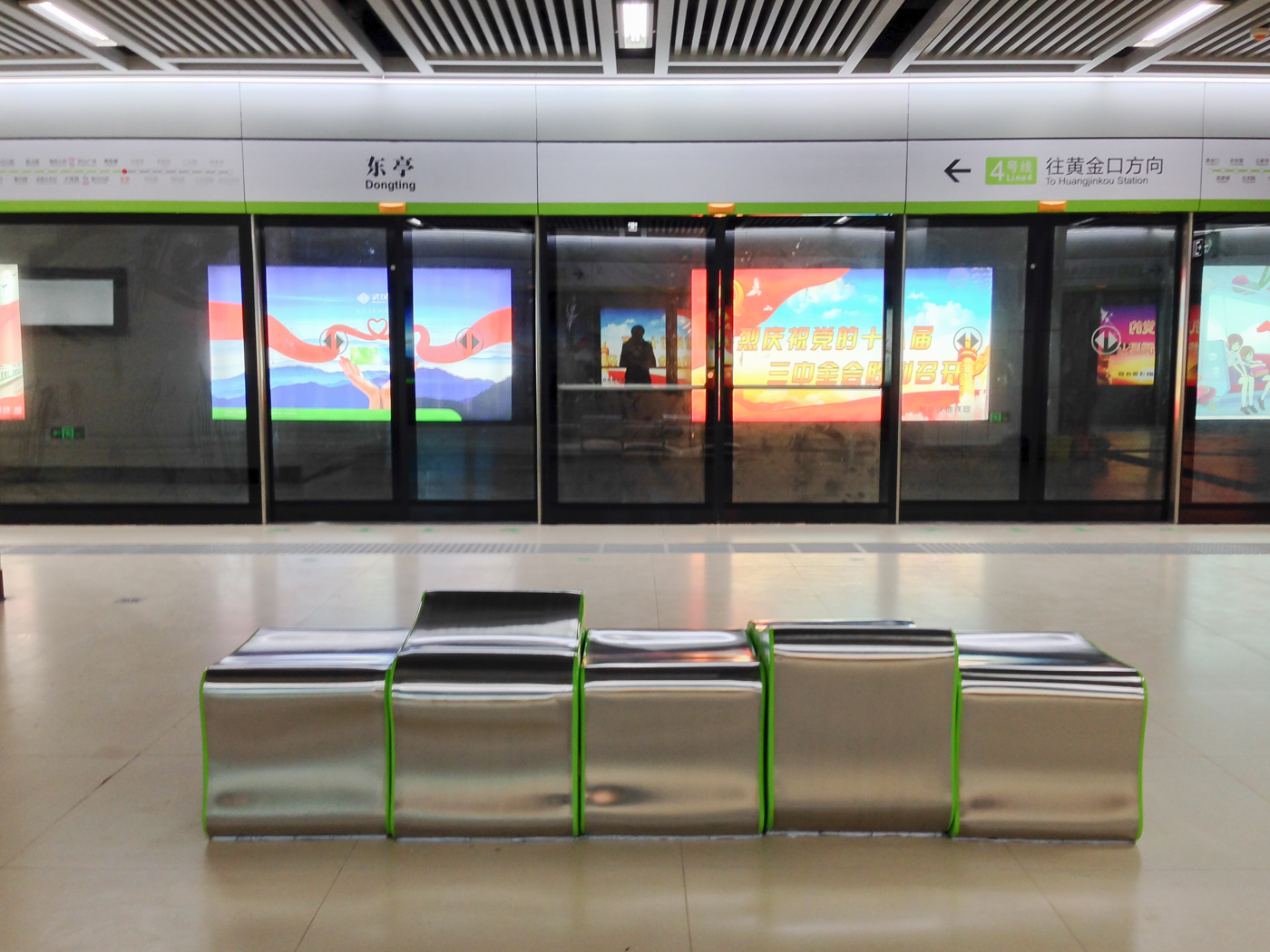

General information
- Location: Wuchang District, Wuhan, Hubei; China
- Operated by: Wuhan Metro Co., Ltd
- Line: Line 4
- Platforms: 2 (1 island platform)

Construction
- Structure type: Underground

History
- Opened: December 28, 2013 (Line 4)

Services
Preceding station	Wuhan Metro	Following station
Qingyuzui towards Bailin	Line 4	Yuejiazui towards Wuhan Railway Station
Location

Dongting Station (Chinese: 东亭站) is a station of Line 4 of Wuhan Metro. It entered revenue service on December 28, 2013. It is located in Wuchang District.

== Station layout ==
G	Entrances and Exits
B1	Concourse	Faregates, Station Agent
B2	Westbound	← Line 4 towards Bailin (Qingyuzui)
B2	Island platform, doors will open on the left
B2	Eastbound	Line 4 towards Wuhan Railway Station (Yuejiazui) →
