= Dongting station (Wuxi Metro) =

Wuxi Metro station

Coordinates: 35°01′25″N 120°21′33″E

Dongting 东亭
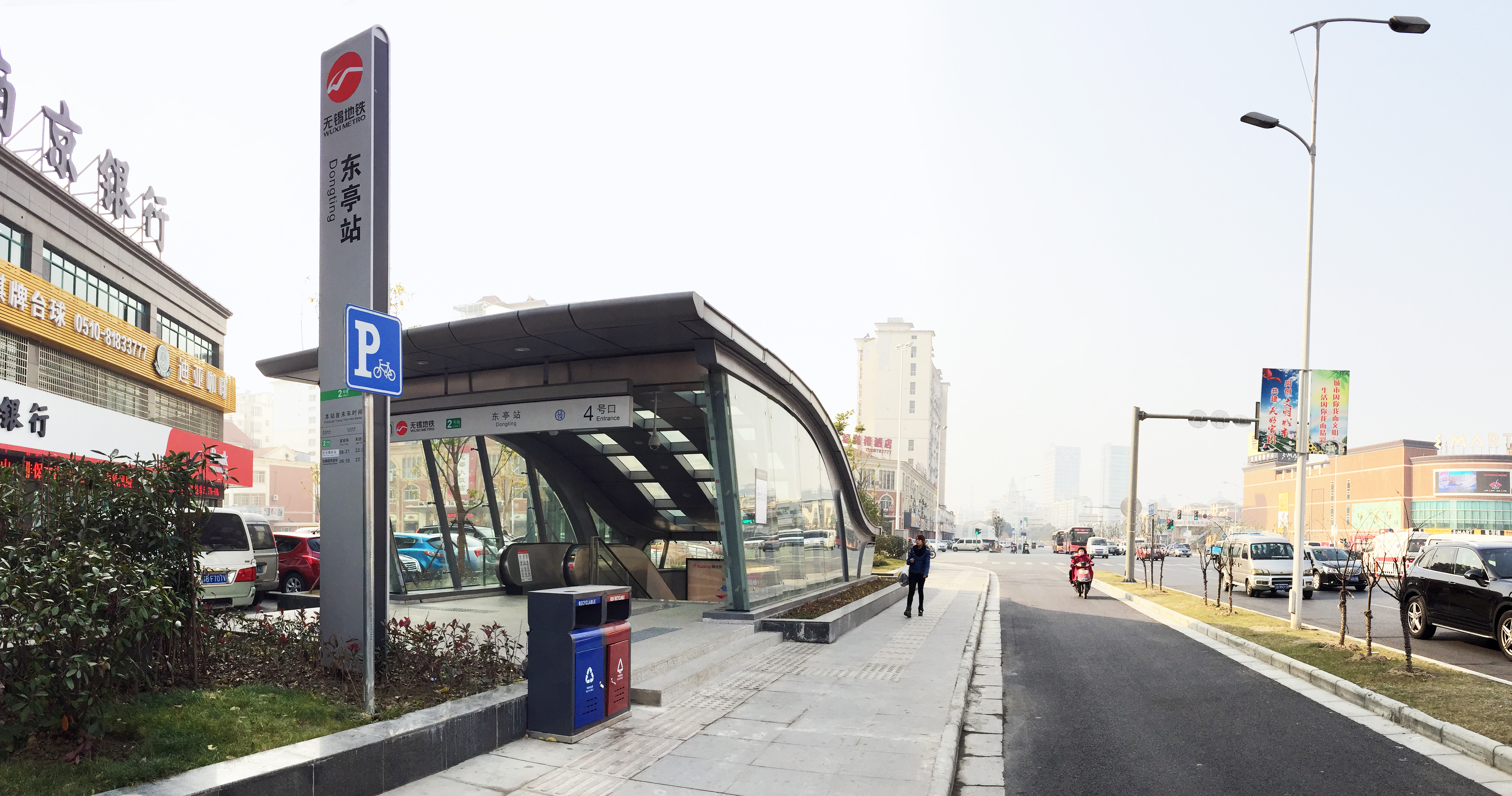
- Exit 4

General information
- Location: Xishan District, Wuxi, Jiangsu; China
- Operated by: Wuxi Metro Corporation
- Lines: Line 2; Line 5 (under construction)
- Platforms: 2 (1 side platform)

Construction
- Structure type: Underground

History
- Opened: 28 December 2014

Services
| Preceding station | Wuxi Metro | Following station |
|---|---|---|
| Baizhuang towards Meiyuan Kaiyuan Temple | Line 2 | Zhuangqiao towards Wuxi East Railway Station |
Location

Dongting Station (Chinese: 东亭站) is a metro station of Line 2 of the Wuxi Metro. It started operations on 28 December 2014. It will be a station of Line 5.

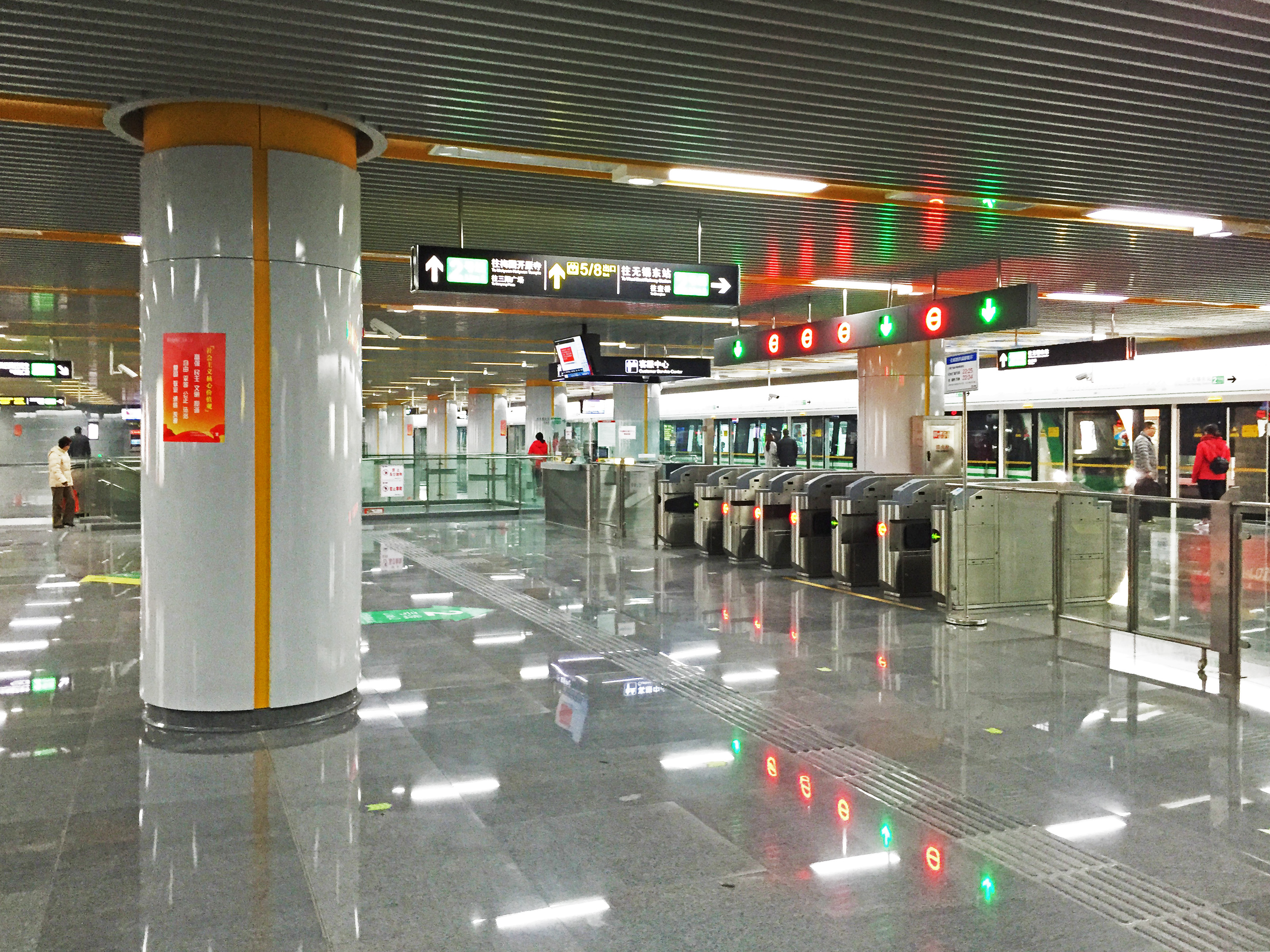
Station hall and platform

Ground
| Ground | Exits |

| B1 | Station Hall | Service Center, Ticket vending machine, Toilet, Elevator, Shops |
| | Side Platform, doors will open on the right |
| | West | ←█ towards Meiyuan Kaiyuan Temple |
| | East | █ towards Anzhen→ |
Side Platform, doors will open on the right
| B2 | West | ←█ towards Lihu |
| B2 | Island Platform, doors will open on the left |
| B2 | East | █ towards Dongbeitang→ |

== Exits ==
There are 4 exits for this station.
