= Civic Center station (Wuxi Metro) =

Metro station in Wuxi, China

Civic Center 市民中心
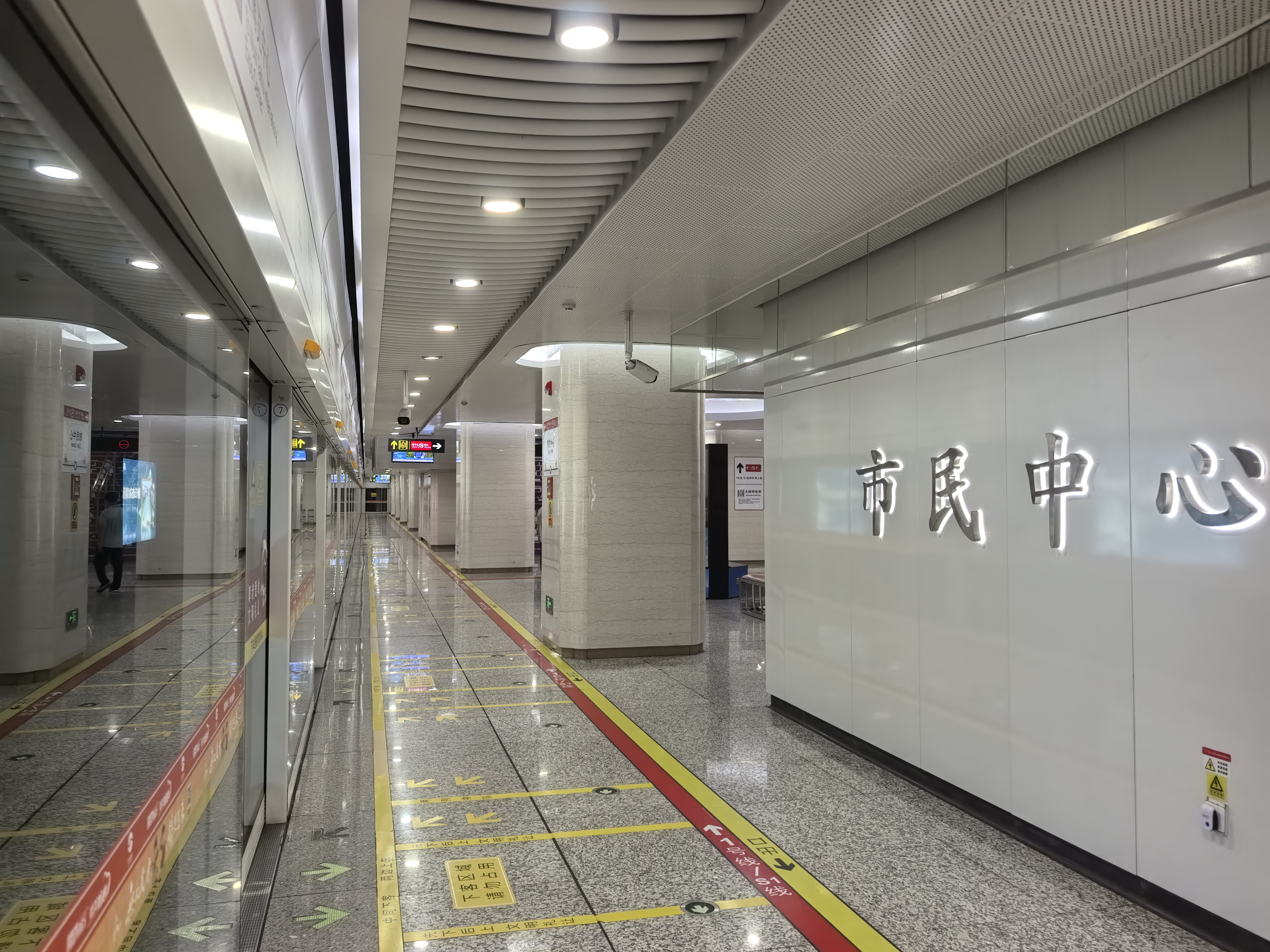
- Platform of Line 4

Chinese name
- Chinese: 市民中心站
Transcriptions
Standard Mandarin
- Hanyu Pinyin: Shìmín Zhōngxīn Zhàn

General information
- Location: Guanshan Road (观山路) × Lide Road (立德道); Binhu District, Wuxi, Jiangsu; China
- Coordinates: 31°29′35″N 120°18′03″E
- System: Wuxi Metro
- Lines: Line 1 Line 4
- Platforms: 4 (2 island platform)
- Tracks: 4

Construction
- Structure type: Underground
- Accessible: Yes

Other information
- Station code: L1/21

History
- Opened: July 1, 2014 (Line 1); December 17, 2021 (Line 4)

Services
Preceding station	Wuxi Metro	Following station
Jinkui Park towards Yanqiao	Line 1	Cultural Palace towards Nanfangquan
Zhouxinyuan towards Liutan	Line 4	Wudu Road towards Wuxi Taihu International Expo Center
Location

Civic Center (Chinese: 市民中心) is a metro station of Line 1 and Line 4 of Wuxi Metro. It started operations on 1 July 2014.

== Station layout ==
1F	Ground level	Exits (except 5B)
B1	Concourse	Exit 5B, customer service center, vending machines
B2		← Line 1 towards Yanqiao / Line S1 towards Jiangyin Bund (Jingui Park)
B2	Island platform, doors open on the left
B2		Line 1 towards Nanfangquan (Cultural Palace) →
B3		← Line 4 towards Liutan (Zhouxinyuan)
B3	Island platform, doors open on the left
B3		Line 4 towards Wuxi Taihu International Expo Center (Wudu Road) →

== Exits ==
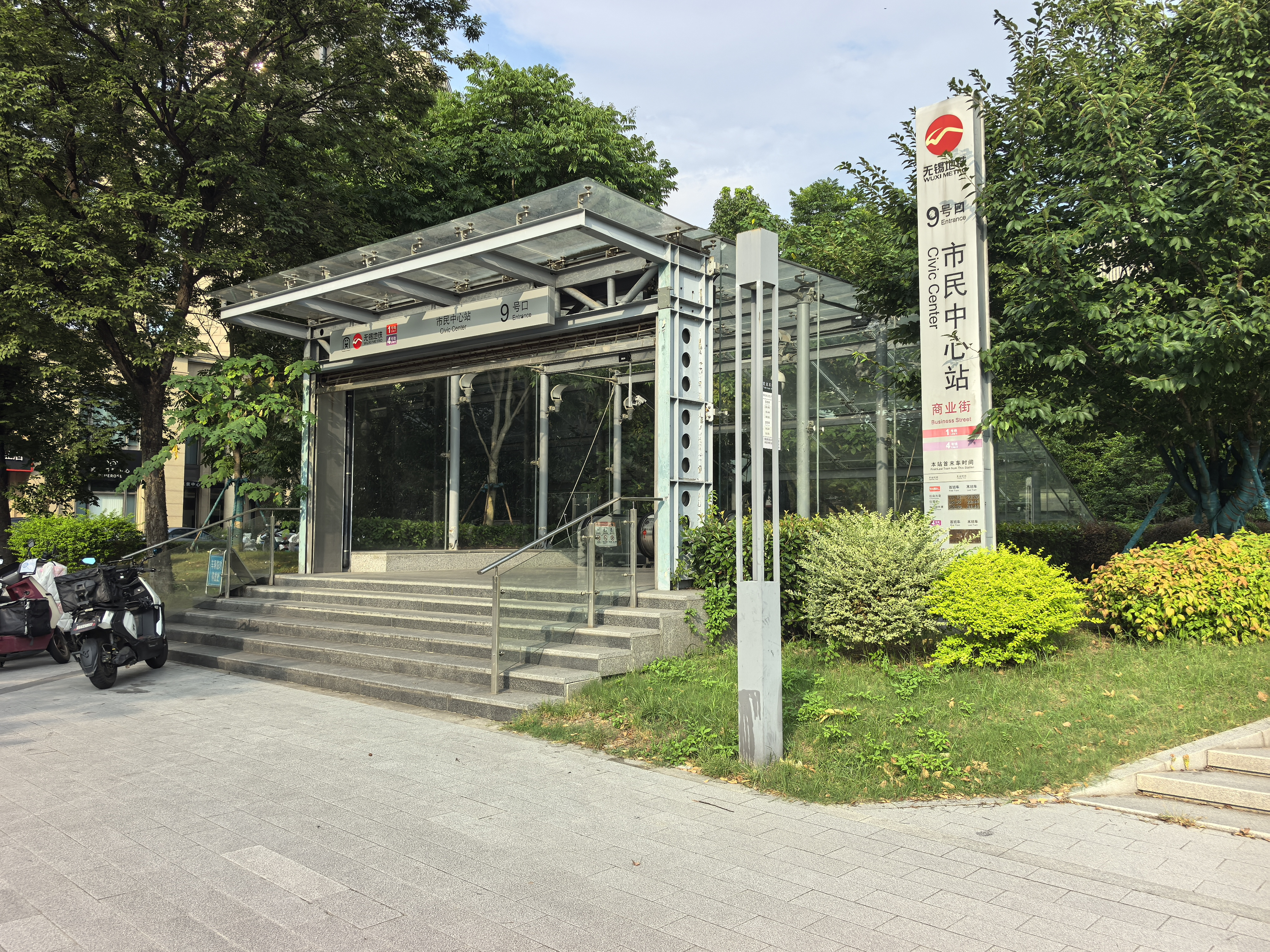
Exit 9

There are 10 exits for this station.
