= Xizhang station =

Wuxi Metro station

Coordinates: 31°38′51″N 120°17′57″E

Xizhang 西漳
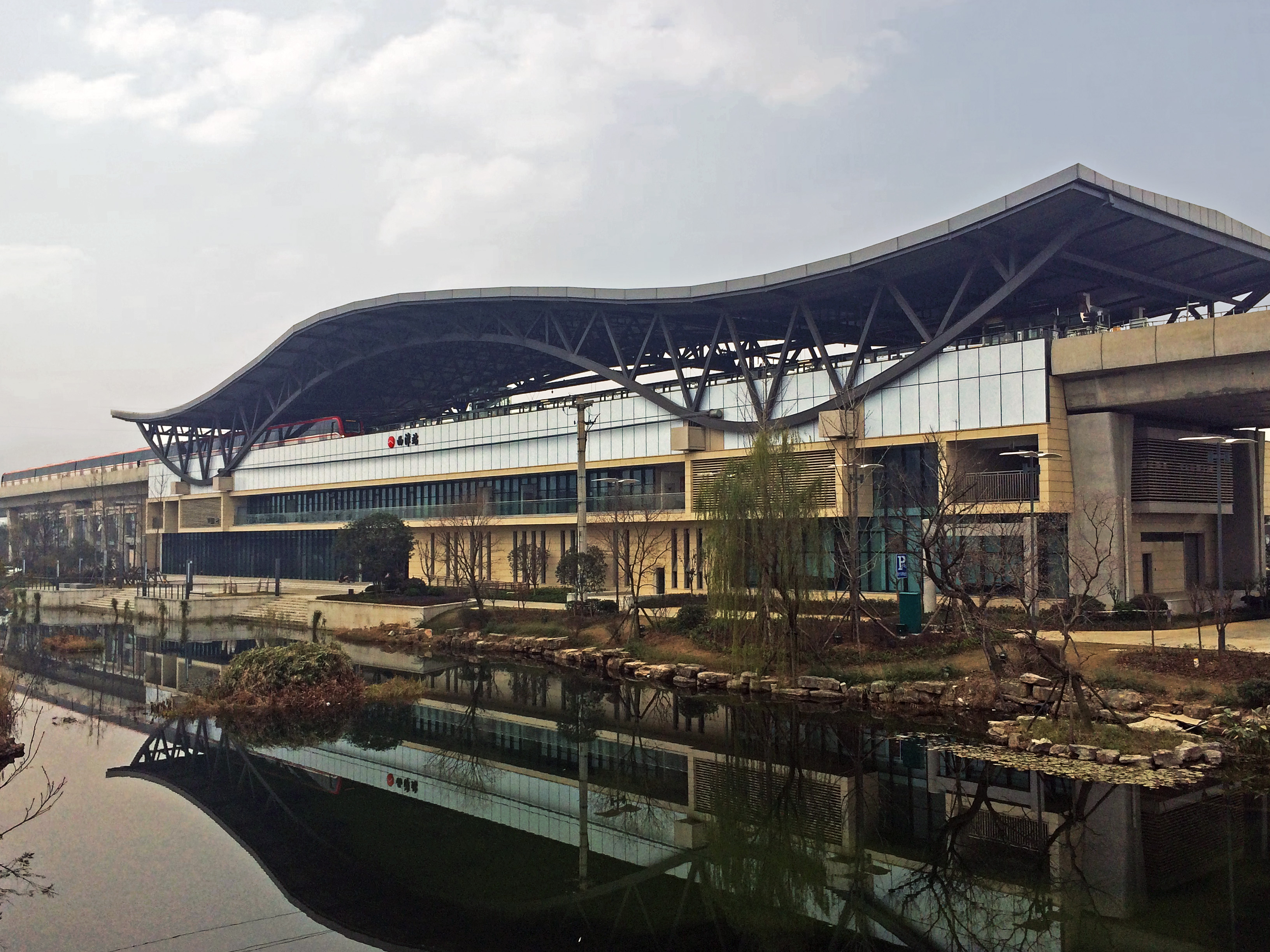

General information
- Location: Huishan District, Wuxi, Jiangsu; China
- Operator: Wuxi Metro Corporation
- Line: Line 1
- Platforms: 2 (1 island platform)

Construction
- Structure type: Elevated

History
- Opened: 1 July 2014

Services
Preceding station	Wuxi Metro	Following station
Xibei Canal towards Yanqiao	Line 1	Tianyi towards Nanfangquan
Location

Xizhang Station (Chinese: 西漳站) is a metro station of Line 1 of the Wuxi Metro. It started operations on 1 July 2014.

== Station layout ==
3F	North	←█ towards Yanqiao
3F	Island Platform, doors will open on the left
3F	South	█ towards Nanfangquan→

2F	Station Hall	Service Center, Ticket vending machine, Toilet, Elevator and Shops

Ground
Ground	Equipment Area	Exits

== Exits ==
There are 4 exits for this station.
