= Liutan station =

Wuxi Metro station

Coordinates: 31°37′42″N 120°17′59″E

Liutan 刘潭
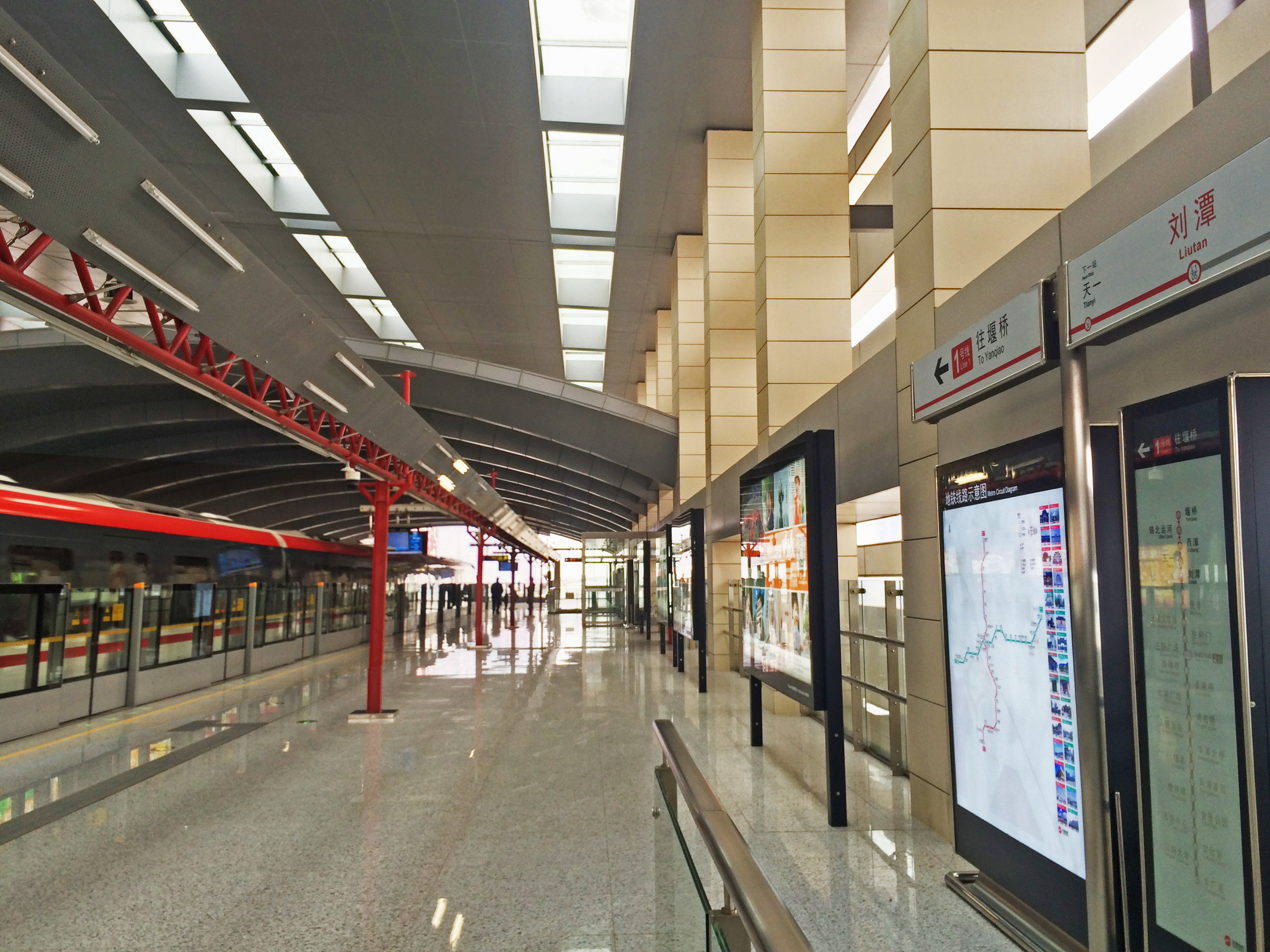

General information
- Location: Huishan District, Wuxi, Jiangsu; China
- Operator: Wuxi Metro Corporation
- Lines: Line 1; Line 4
- Platforms: 4 (2 side platform)

Construction
- Structure type: Elevated (Line 1); Underground (Line 4)

History
- Opened: 1 July 2014 (Line 1); 17 December 2021 (Line 4)

Services
Preceding station	Wuxi Metro	Following station
Tianyi towards Yanqiao	Line 1	Zhuangqian towards Nanfangquan
Terminus	Line 4	Guangshi Road towards Wuxi Taihu International Expo Center
Location

Liutan Station (Chinese: 刘潭站; pinyin: Liútán zhàn) is a metro station of Line 1 and Line 4 of Wuxi Metro. It started operations on 1 July 2014.

== Station layout ==
3F	Side Platform, doors will open on the right
3F	North	←█ towards Yanqiao
3F	South	█towards Nanfangquan→
3F	Side Platform, doors will open on the right

2F	Station Hall	Service Center, Ticket vending machine, Elevators, Shops

Ground
Ground	Equipment Area	Exits, Mall, Toilet

B1	North	█ Terminus
B1	Island Platform, doors will open on the left
B1	South	█ towards Wuxi Taihu International Expo Center→

== Exits ==
There are 2 exits for this station.
