= Zhuangqian station =

Wuxi Metro station

Coordinates: 31°36′42″N 120°18′01″E

Zhuangqian 庄前
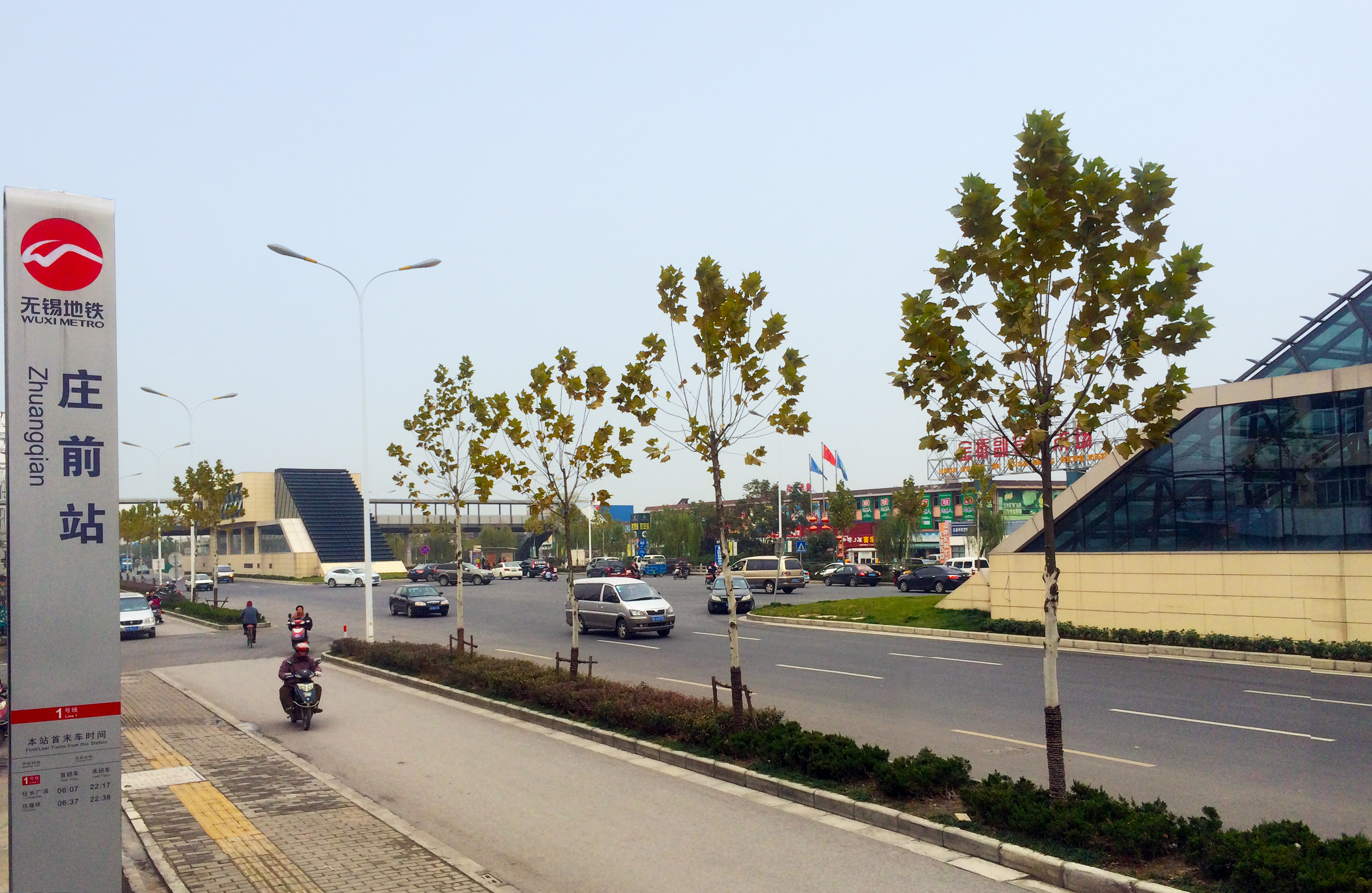

General information
- Location: Beitang District, Wuxi, Jiangsu; China
- Operator: Wuxi Metro Corporation
- Line: Line 1
- Platforms: 2 (1 island platform)

Construction
- Structure type: Elevated hall/Underground platforms

History
- Opened: 1 July 2014

Services
Preceding station	Wuxi Metro	Following station
Liutan towards Yanqiao	Line 1	Minfeng towards Nanfangquan
Location

Zhuangqian Station (Chinese: 庄前站) is a metro station of Line 1 of the Wuxi Metro. It started operations on 1 July 2014.

== Station layout ==
2F	Station Hall	Service Center, Ticket vending machine, Elevator

Ground
Ground	Equipment Area	Exits

B1	Equipment Area
B2	North	←█ towards Yanqiao
B2	Island Platform, doors will open on the left
B2	South	█ towards Nanfangquan→

== Exits ==
There are 4 exits for this station.
