= Taihu Square station =

Wuxi Metro station

Coordinates: 31°33′25″N 120°18′01″E

Taihu Square 太湖广场
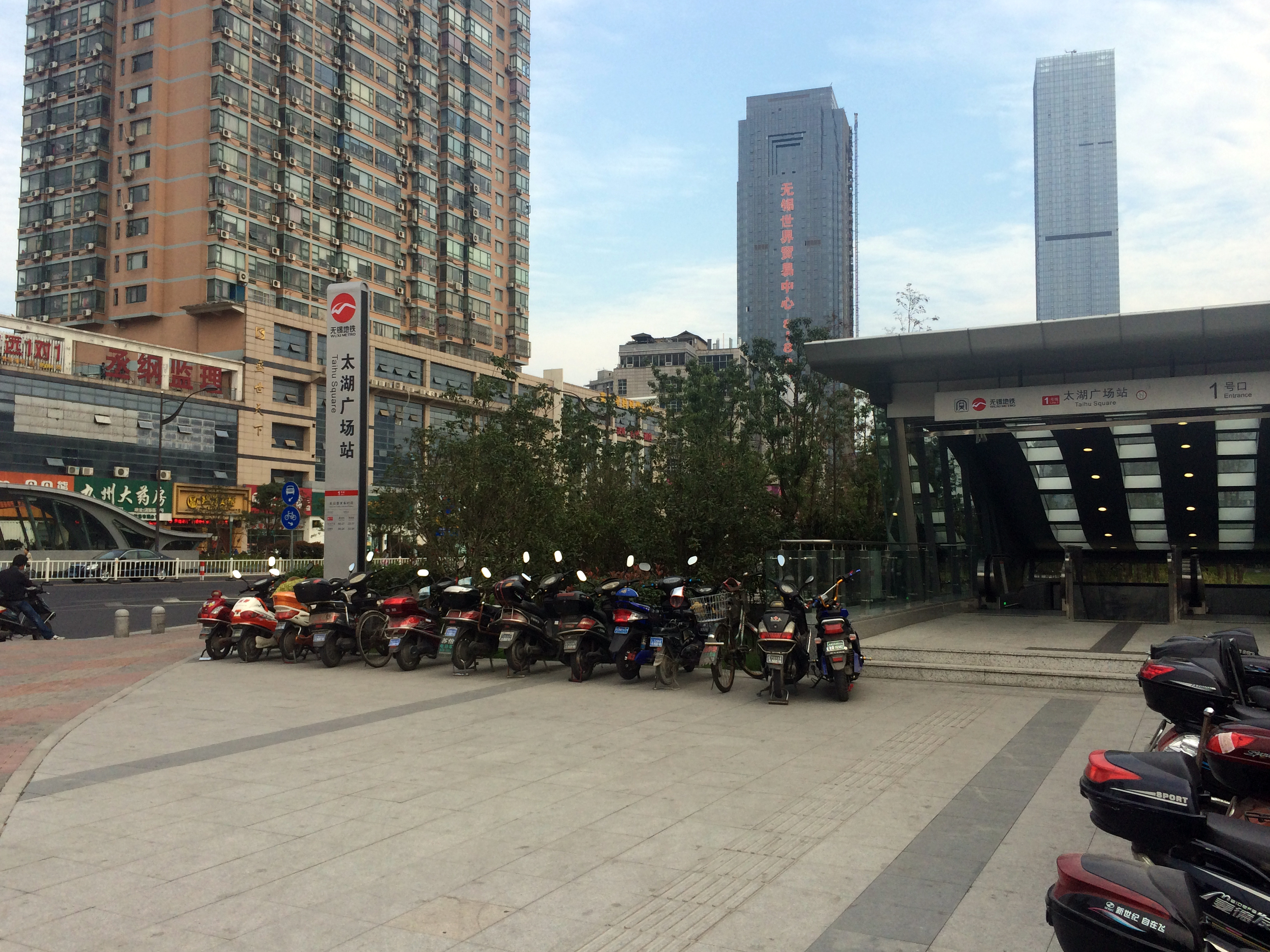

General information
- Location: Nanchang District, Wuxi, Jiangsu; China
- Operator: Wuxi Metro Corporation
- Line: Line 1
- Platforms: 2 (1 island platform)

Construction
- Structure type: Underground

History
- Opened: 1 July 2014

Services
Preceding station	Wuxi Metro	Following station
Tanduqiao towards Yanqiao	Line 1	Qingmingqiao towards Nanfangquan
Location

Taihu Square Station (Chinese: 太湖广场站) is a metro station of Line 1 of the Wuxi Metro. It started operations on 1 July 2014.

== Station layout ==
Ground
Ground	Exits

B1	Station Hall	Service Center, Ticket vending machine, Toilet, Elevator, FamilyMart
B2	North	←█ towards Yanqiao
B2	Island Platform, doors will open on the left
B2	South	█ towards Nanfangquan→

== Exits ==
There are 4 exits for this station.

== Gallery ==
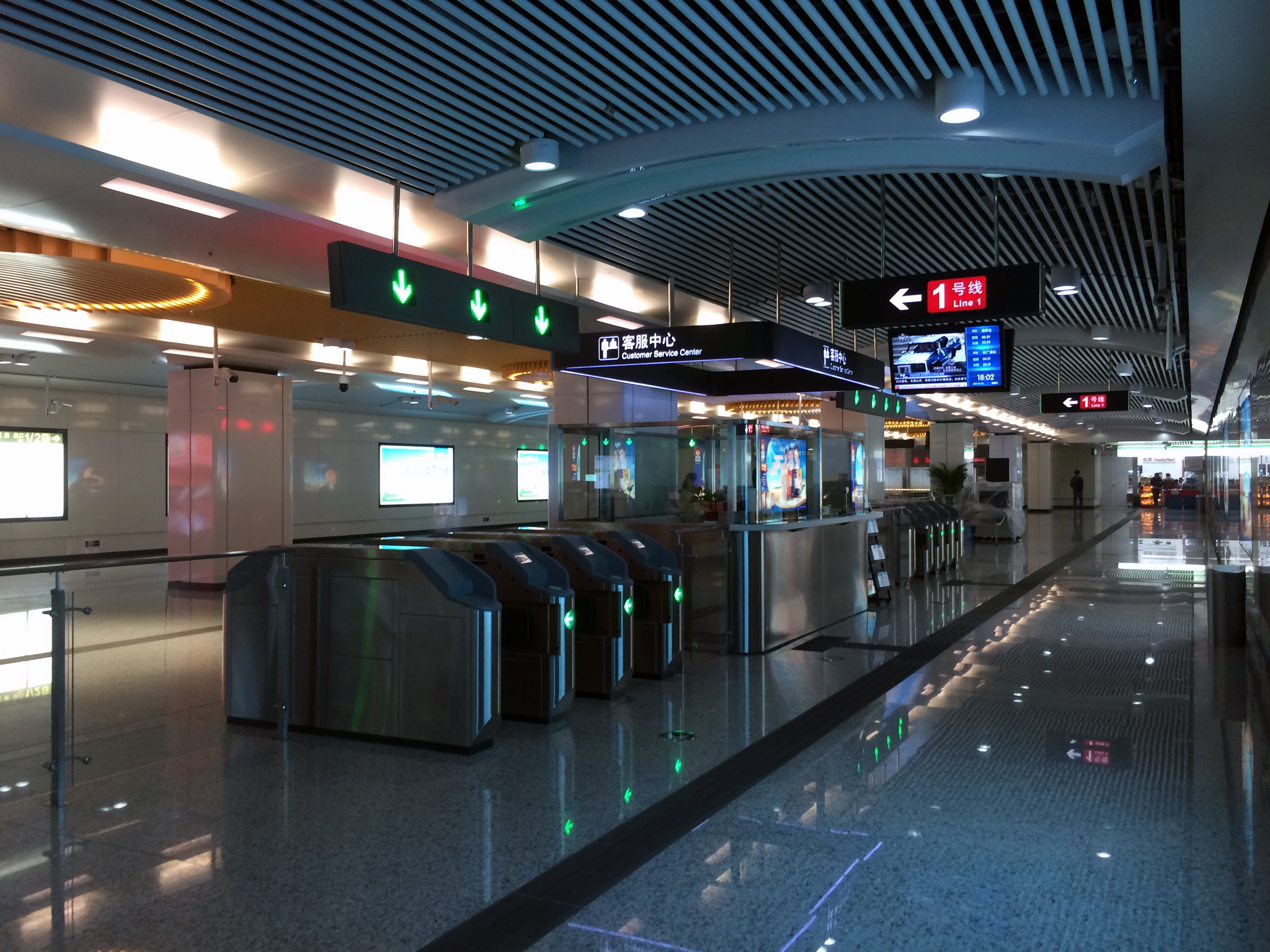
Station Hall

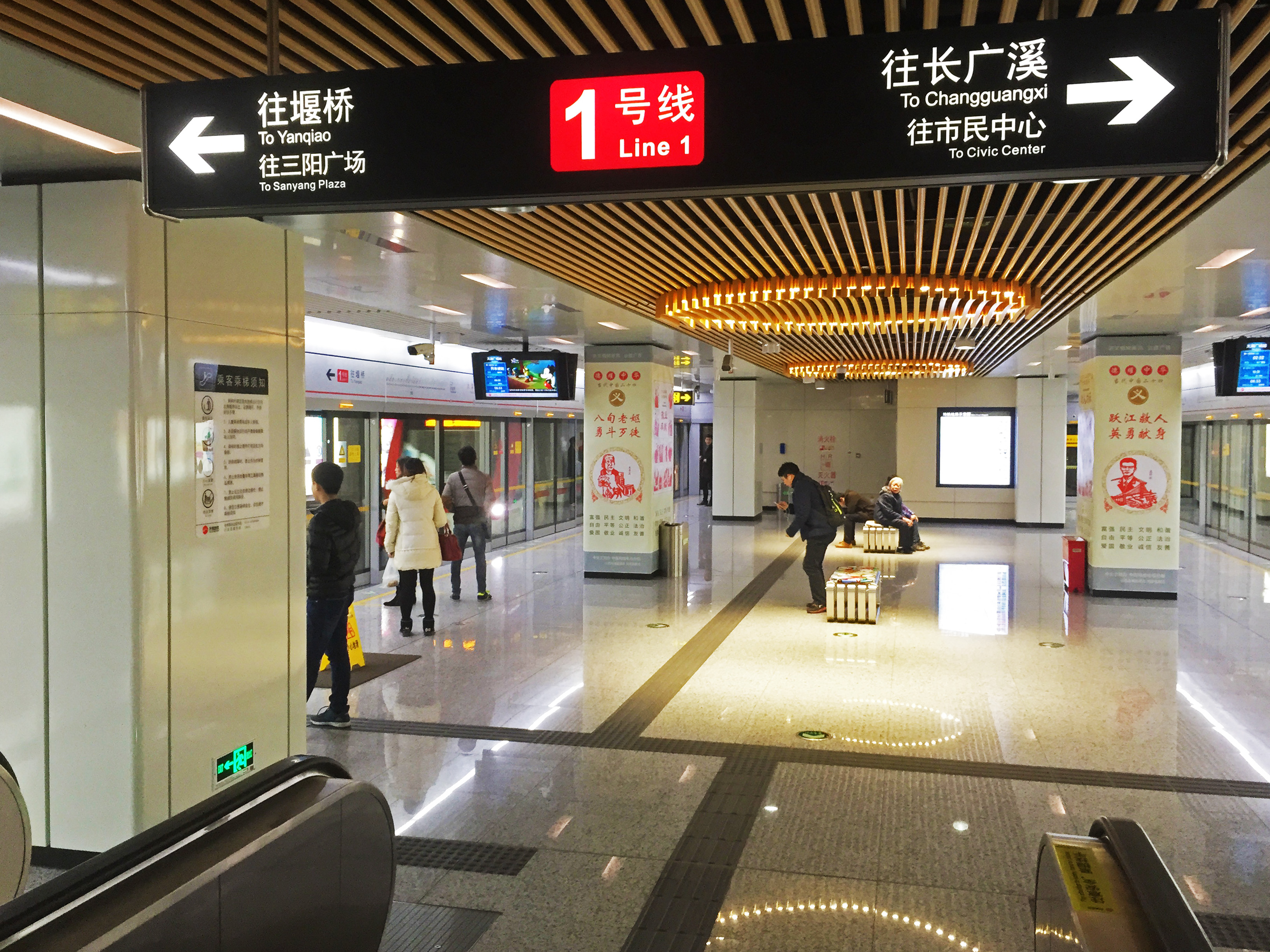
Platform
