= Nanhujiayuan station =

Wuxi Metro station

Coordinates: 31°30′42″N 120°19′10″E

Nanhujiayuan 南湖家园
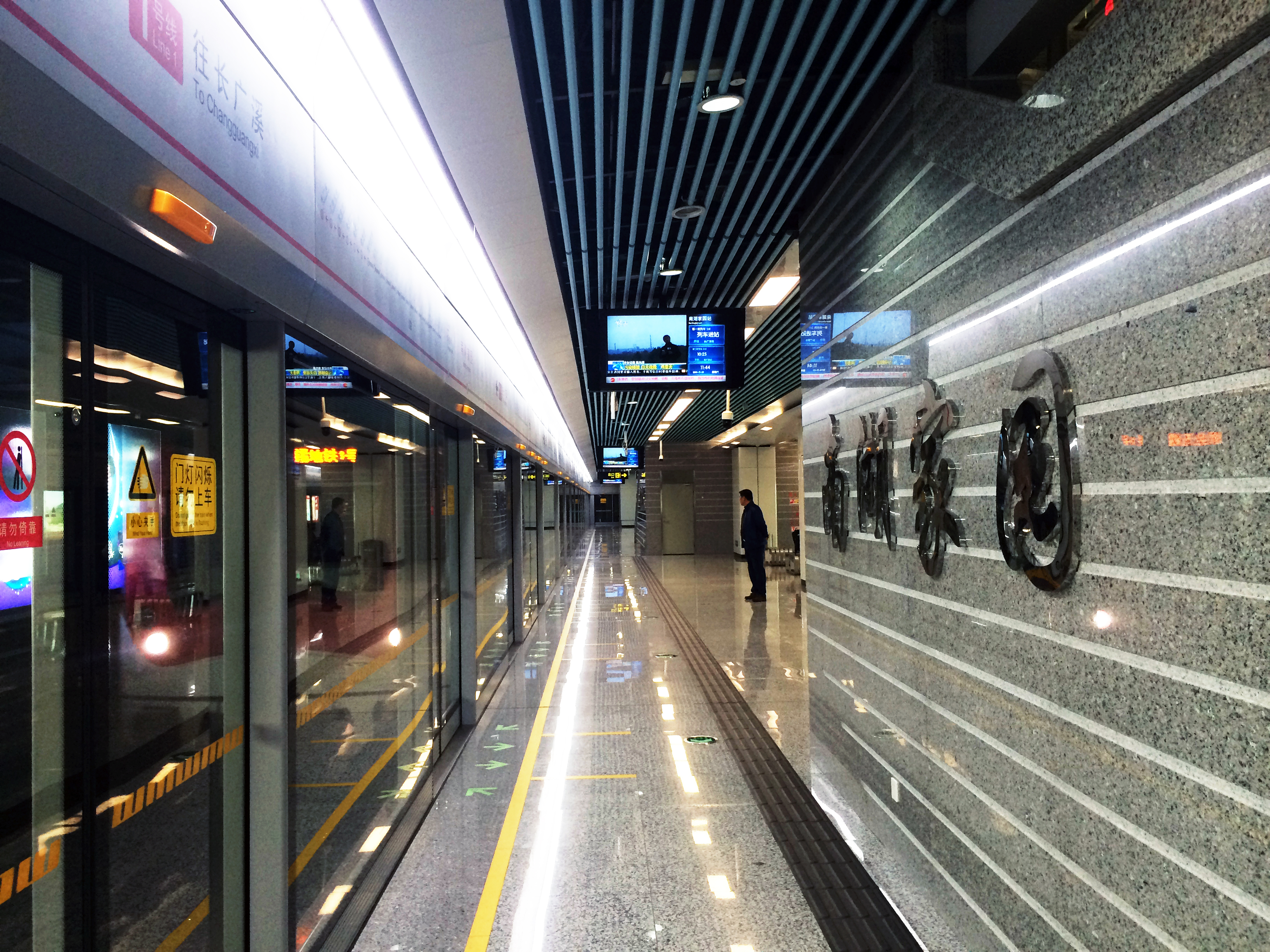
- Platform

General information
- Location: Binhu District, Wuxi, Jiangsu; China
- Operator: Wuxi Metro Corporation
- Line: Line 1
- Platforms: 2 (1 island platform)

Construction
- Structure type: Underground

History
- Opened: 1 July 2014

Services
| Preceding station | Wuxi Metro | Following station |
|---|---|---|
| Yangming towards Yanqiao | Line 1 | Tangtieqiao towards Nanfangquan |
Location

Nanhujiayuan Station (Chinese: 南湖家园站) is a metro station of Line 1 of the Wuxi Metro in China. It started operations on 1 July 2014.

== Station layout ==
Ground
| Ground | Exits |

| B1 | Station Hall | Service Center, Ticket vending machine, Toilet, Elevator, Shops |
| B2 | North | ←█ towards Yanqiao |
| B2 | Island Platform, doors will open on the left |
| B2 | South | █ towards Nanfangquan→ |

== Exits ==
There are 3 exits for this station.
