= Xibei Canal station =

Wuxi Metro station

Coordinates: 31°39′50″N 120°18′37″E

Xibei Canal 锡北运河
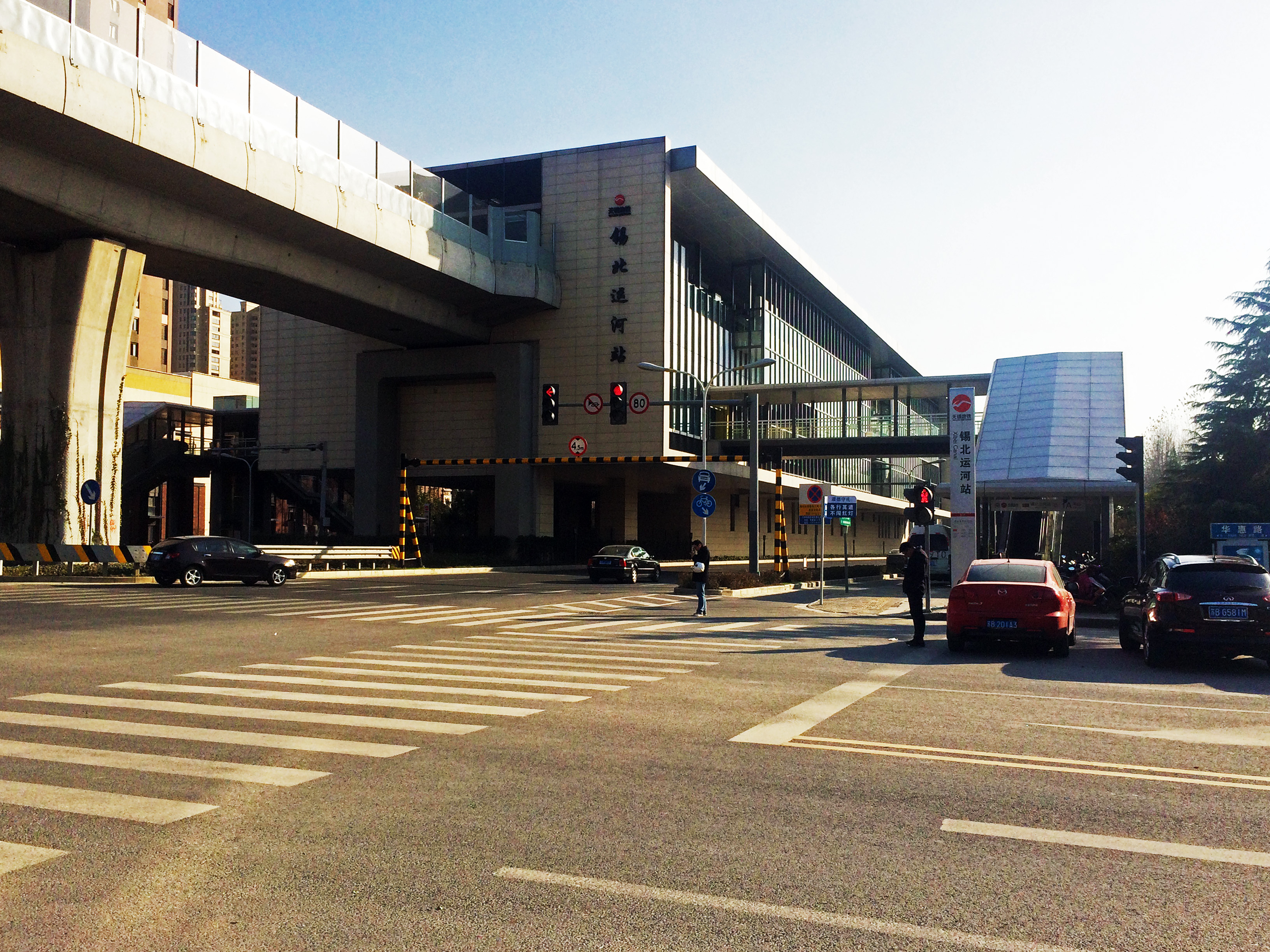

General information
- Location: Huishan District, Wuxi, Jiangsu; China
- Operator: Wuxi Metro Corporation
- Line: Line 1
- Platforms: 2 (1 side platform)

Construction
- Structure type: Elevated

History
- Opened: 1 July 2014

Services
Preceding station	Wuxi Metro	Following station
Yanqiao Terminus	Line 1	Xizhang towards Nanfangquan
Location

Xibei Canal Station (Chinese: 锡北运河站) is a metro station of Line 1 of the Wuxi Metro. It started operations on 1 July 2014.

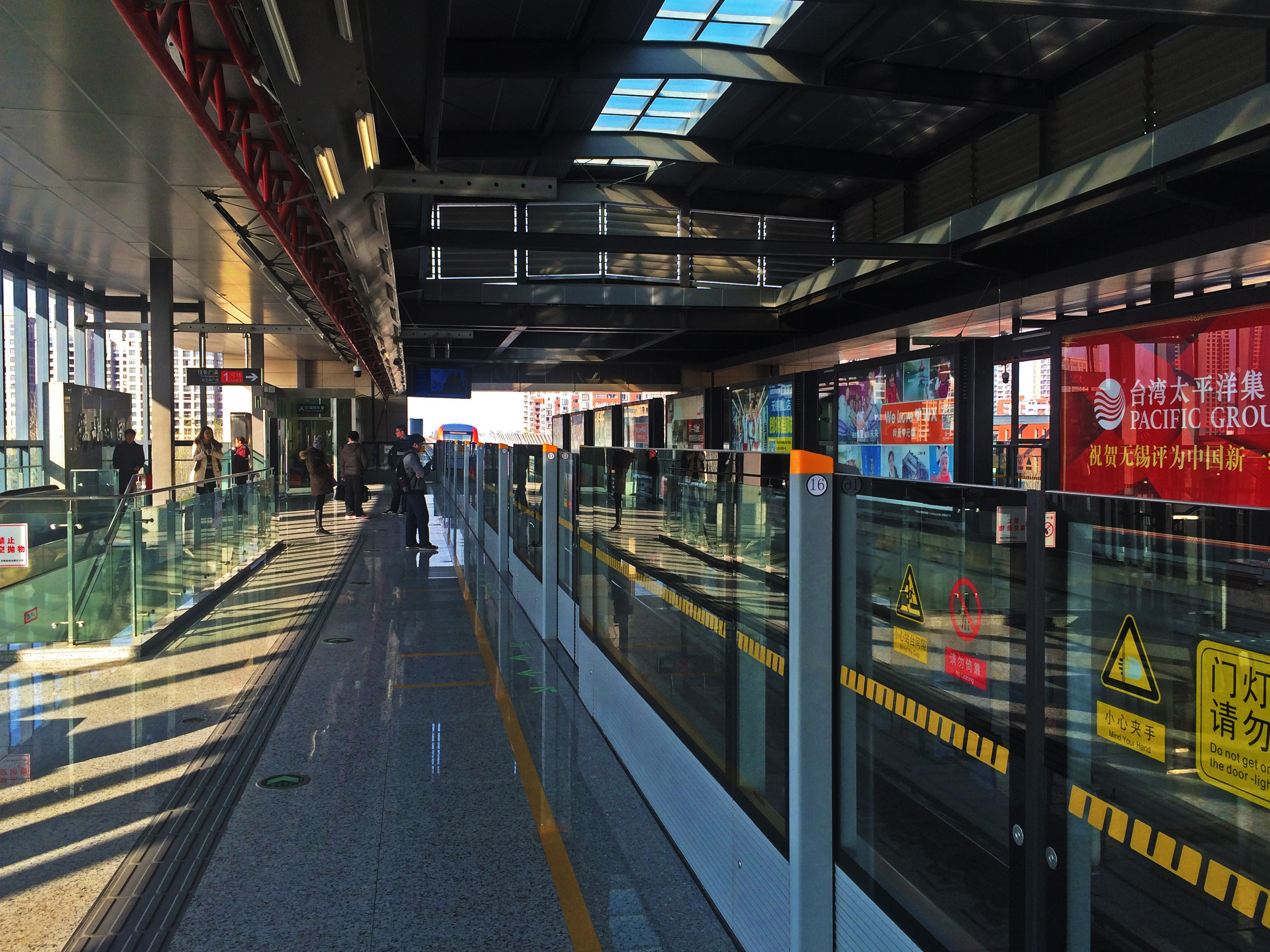
Platform

== Station layout ==
3F	Side Platform, doors will open on the right
3F	North	←█ towards Yanqiao
3F	South	█towards Nanfangquan→
3F	Side Platform, doors will open on the right

2F	Station Hall	Service Center, Ticket vending machine, Toilet, Elevator and Shops

Ground
Ground	Equipment Area	Exits

== Exits ==
There are 4 exits for this station.
