= Jinkui Park station =

Wuxi Metro station

Coordinates: 31°29′43″N 120°18′56″E

Jinkui Park 金匮公园
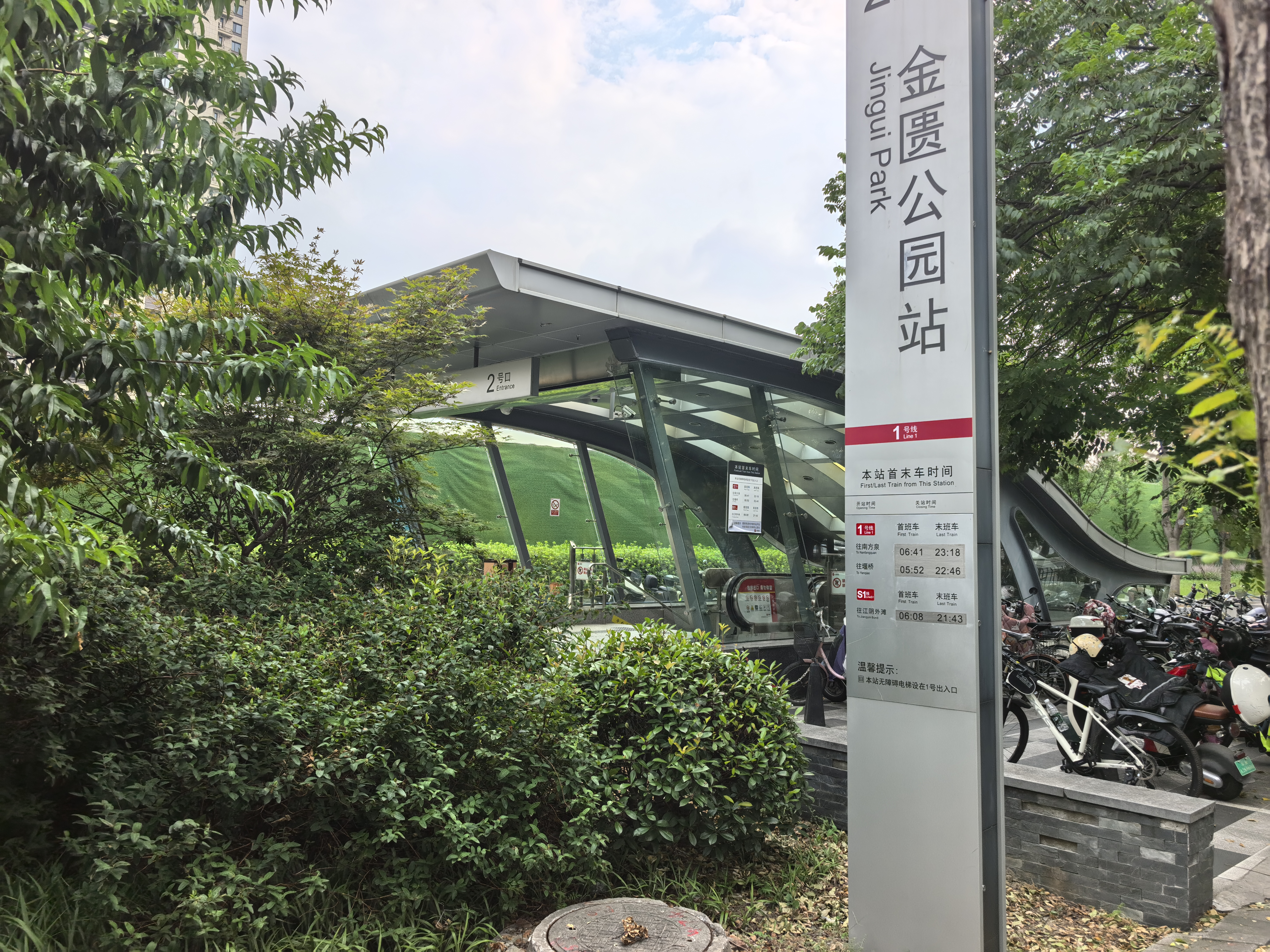
- Exit 2

General information
- Location: Binhu District, Wuxi, Jiangsu; China
- Operator: Wuxi Metro Corporation
- Line: Line 1
- Platforms: 2 (1 island platform)

Construction
- Structure type: Underground

History
- Opened: 1 July 2014

Services
Preceding station	Wuxi Metro	Following station
Tangtieqiao towards Yanqiao	Line 1	Civic Center towards Nanfangquan
Location

Jinkui Park Station (Chinese: 金匮公园站) is a metro station of Line 1 of the Wuxi Metro. It started operations on 1 July 2014.

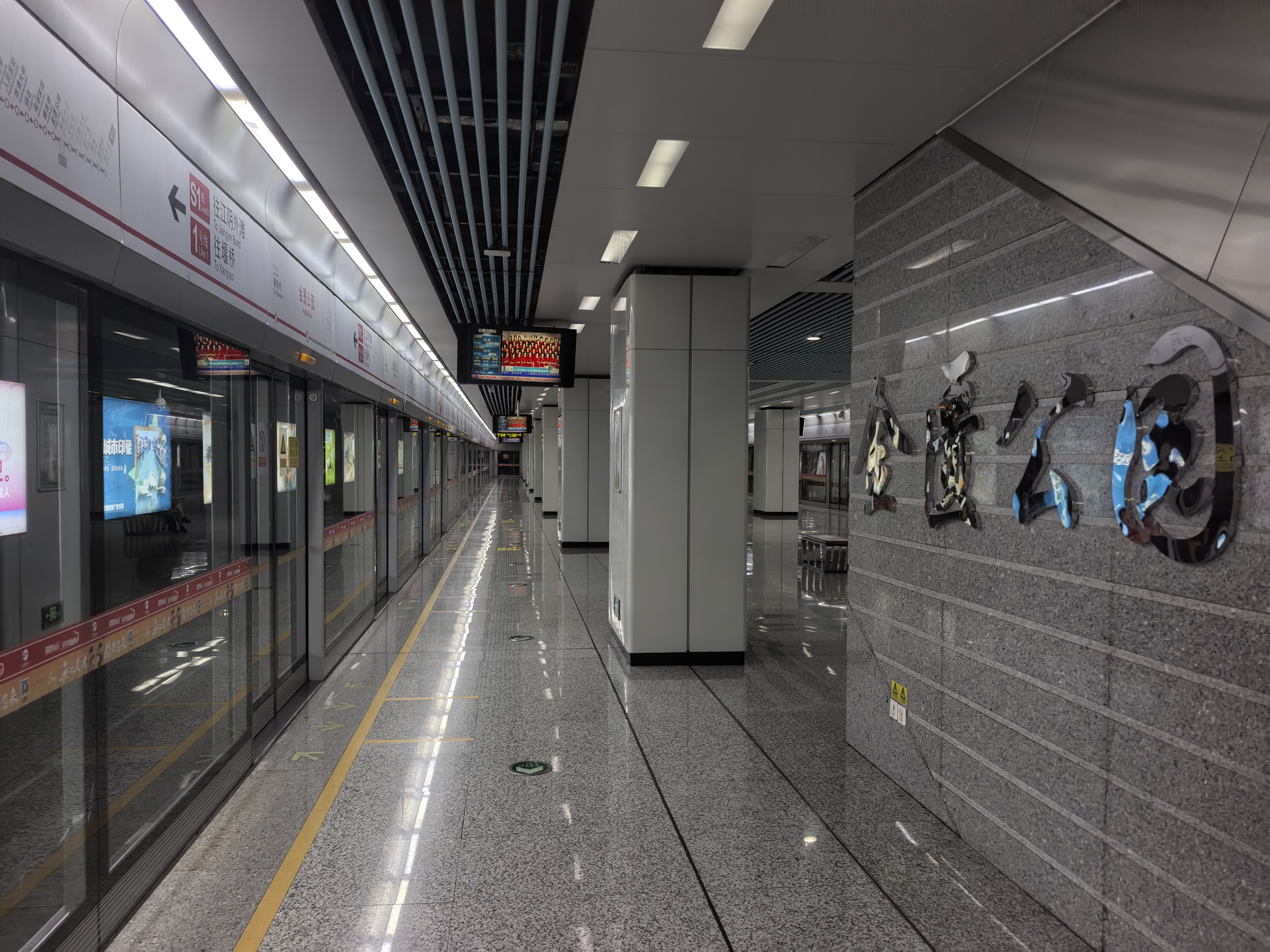
Platform

== Station layout ==
Ground
Ground	Exits

B1	Station Hall	Service Center, Ticket vending machine, Toilet, Elevator, Top Up Center for Citizen Card, FamilyMart
B2	East	←█ towards Yanqiao
B2	Island Platform, doors will open on the left
B2	West	█ towards Nanfangquan→

== Exits ==
There are 3 exits for this station.
