= Nanchan Temple (disambiguation) =

Nanchan Temple, Wutai, Shanxi is the oldest existing wooden building in China.

Nanchan Temple or 南禪寺 may also refer to:

- Nanchan Temple Station (Chinese: 南禅寺站), a station of the Wuxi Metro
- Nanzen-ji, a Buddhist temple in Kyoto, Japan
