= Line 1 (Wuxi Metro) =

Metro line in Wuxi, China

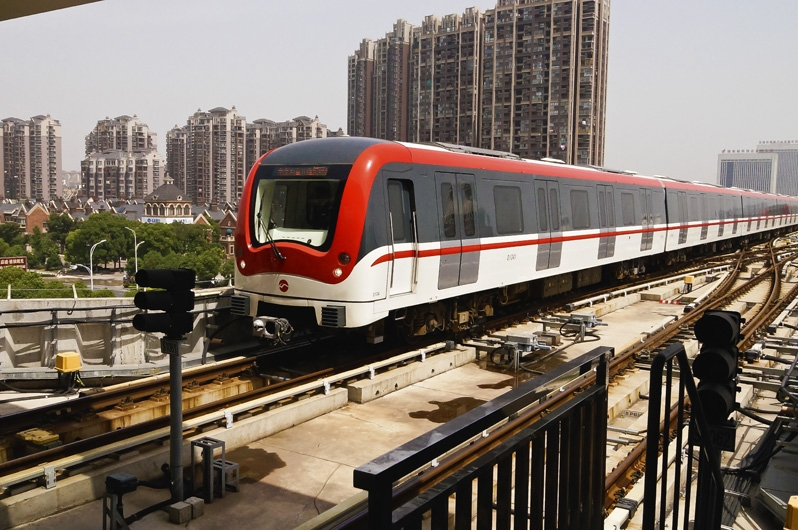
- A train of Wuxi Metro Line 1

Overview
- Status: Operational
- Owner: Wuxi Government
- Locale: Wuxi, Jiangsu, China
- Termini: Yanqiao; Nanfangquan
- Stations: 27

Service
- Type: Rapid transit
- System: Wuxi Metro
- Services: 1
- Operator(s): Wuxi Metro Corporation
- Rolling stock: 6-car Class B
- Daily ridership: 130,000 (May 2016 Avg.)

History
- Opened: 1 July 2014; 11 years ago

Technical
- Line length: 34.6 km (21.50 mi)
- Number of tracks: 2
- Character: Underground and Elevated
- Track gauge: 1,435 mm (4 ft 8 1/2 in)
- Electrification: 1,500 V DC third rail

Broadcasting for Wuxi Metro Line 1

Line 1 of the Wuxi Metro (Chinese: 无锡地铁1号线; pinyin: Wúxī Dìtiě Yī Hào Xiàn) is a rapid transit line running from north to south, in Wuxi, Jiangsu Province, China.

== Description ==
=== Line 1 ===
Line 1 was opened on 1 July 2014 and a Southern extension opened on 28 September 2019. The line is 34.6 km long with 27 stations.

=== Line S1 ===
A separate-named northern extension, called Line S1, is started construction in October 2019, construction completed in 2023. Line S1 opened on 31 January 2024 (free trial before formal open during 20–22 January).

Line S1 is 30.4 km in length with 10 new stations (9 in operation, Xiakewan Science City station is under construction), including 10.5 km underground section and 5 underground stations. There are through service between Lines 1 and S1.

Further extension of Line S1 including a Northern extension to Jingjiang (a county-level city), a Southern extension to urban area of Wuxi, and a branch to Sunan Shuofang International Airport.

== Opening timeline ==
Segment	Commencement	Length	Station(s)	Name
Yanqiao — Changguangxi	1 July 2014	29.42 km (18.28 mi)	24	Line 1 Phase 1
Changguangxi — Nanfangquan	28 September 2019	5.187 km (3.22 mi)	3	Line 1 Southern extension

== Stations (north to south) ==
Station №	Station name		Connections	Distance km		Location
Station №	English	Chinese	Connections	Distance km		Location
↑ Through service to Line S1↑
L101	Yanqiao	堰桥		0.00	0.00	Huishan
L102	Xibei Canal	锡北运河		1.48	1.48	Huishan
L103	Xizhang	西漳		2.31	3.79	Huishan
L104	Tianyi	天一		0.89	4.68	Huishan
L105	Liutan	刘潭	4	1.24	5.92	Huishan
L106	Zhuangqian	庄前		1.86	7.78	Liangxi
L107	Minfeng	民丰		1.01	8.79	Liangxi
L108	Wuxi Railway Station	无锡火车站	3 WXH	1.52	10.31	Liangxi
L109	Shenglimen	胜利门		1.01	11.32	Liangxi
L110	Sanyang Plaza	三阳广场	2	0.67	11.99	Liangxi
L111	Nanchan Temple	南禅寺		1.11	13.10	Liangxi
L112	Tanduqiao	谈渡桥		0.75	13.85	Binhu
L113	Taihu Square	太湖广场		0.81	14.66	Binhu
L114	Qingmingqiao	清名桥		0.86	15.52	Binhu
L115	People's Hospital	人民医院		1.12	16.64	Binhu
L116	Huaqingdaqiao	华清大桥		1.19	17.83	Binhu
L117	Yangming	扬名		1.64	19.47	Binhu
L118	Nanhujiayuan	南湖家园		1.30	20.77	Binhu
L119	Tangtieqiao	塘铁桥		1.02	21.79	Binhu
L120	Jinkui Park	金匮公园		1.21	23.00	Binhu
L121	Civic Center	市民中心	4	1.44	24.44	Binhu
L122	Cultural Palace	文化宫		1.37	25.81	Binhu
L123	Jiangnan University	江南大学		1.68	27.49	Binhu
L124	Changguangxi	长广溪		1.18	28.67	Binhu
L125	Xuelang	雪浪				Binhu
L126	Gedaiqiao	葛埭桥				Binhu
L127	Nanfangquan	南方泉				Binhu

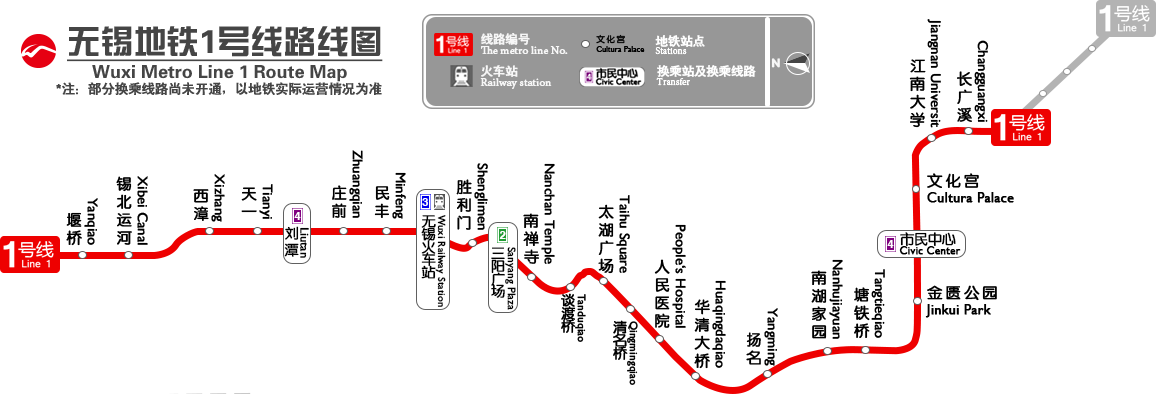
Map of Line 1
