= Nanchan Temple station =

Wuxi Metro station

Coordinates: 31°34′10″N 120°18′05″E

Nanchan Temple 南禅寺
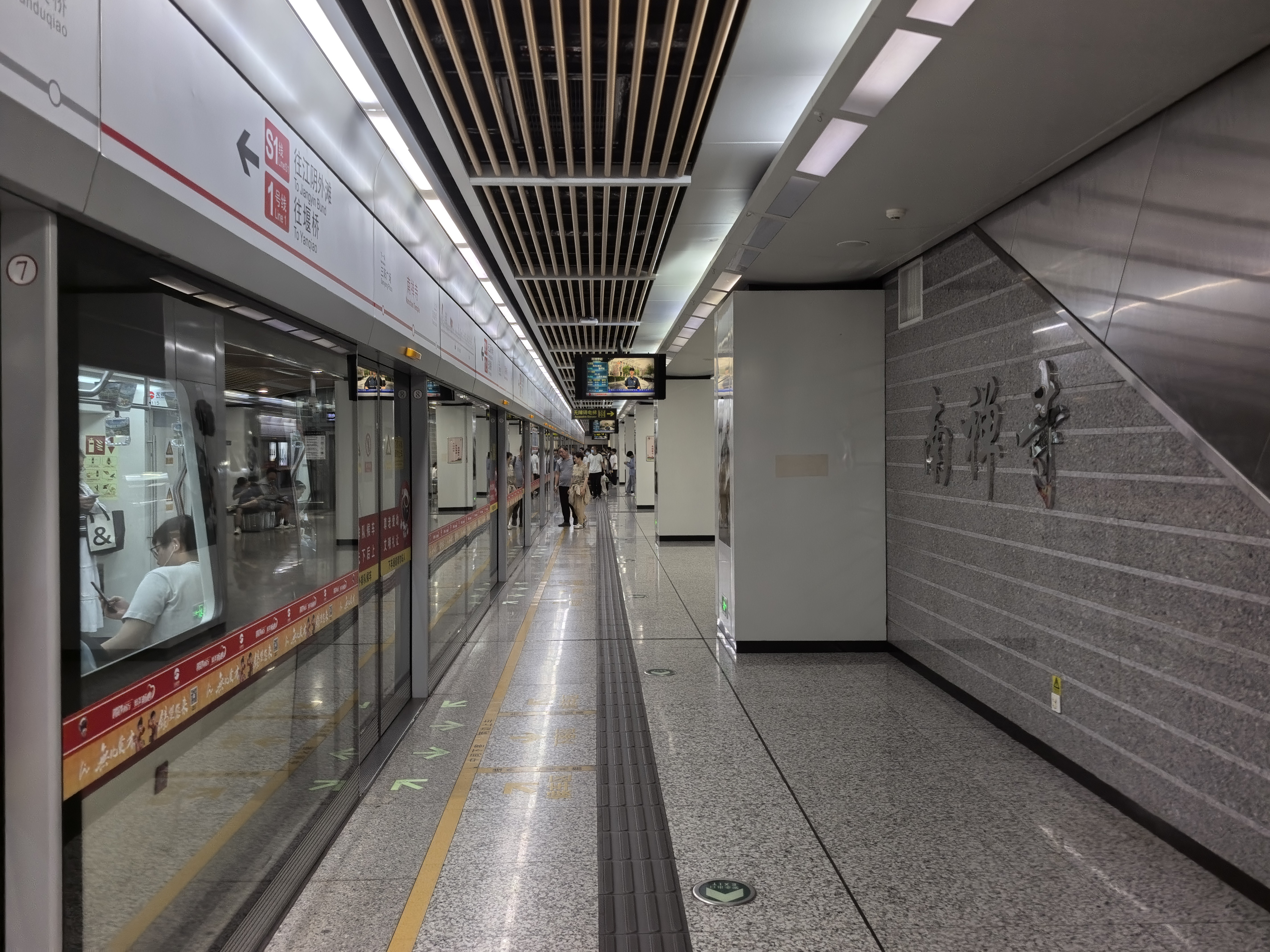
- Platform

General information
- Location: Chong'an District, Wuxi, Jiangsu; China
- Operator: Wuxi Metro Corporation
- Line: Line 1
- Platforms: 2 (1 island platform)

Construction
- Structure type: Underground

History
- Opened: 1 July 2014

Services
Preceding station	Wuxi Metro	Following station
Sanyang Plaza towards Yanqiao	Line 1	Tanduqiao towards Nanfangquan
Location

Nanchan Temple Station (Chinese: 南禅寺站) is a metro station of Line 1 of the Wuxi Metro. It is located near Nanchan Temple, a Buddhist temple. The station started operations on 1 July 2014.

== Station layout ==
Ground
Ground	Exits

B1	Station Hall	Service Center, Ticket vending machine, Toilet, Elevator, Top Up Center for Citizen Card, FamilyMart
B2	North	←█ towards Yanqiao
B2	Island Platform, doors will open on the left
B2	South	█ towards Nanfangquan→

== Exits ==
There are 5 exits for this station.

== Around the station ==
- Wuxi Mosque
