= Line 4 (Wuxi Metro) =

Metro line in Wuxi, China

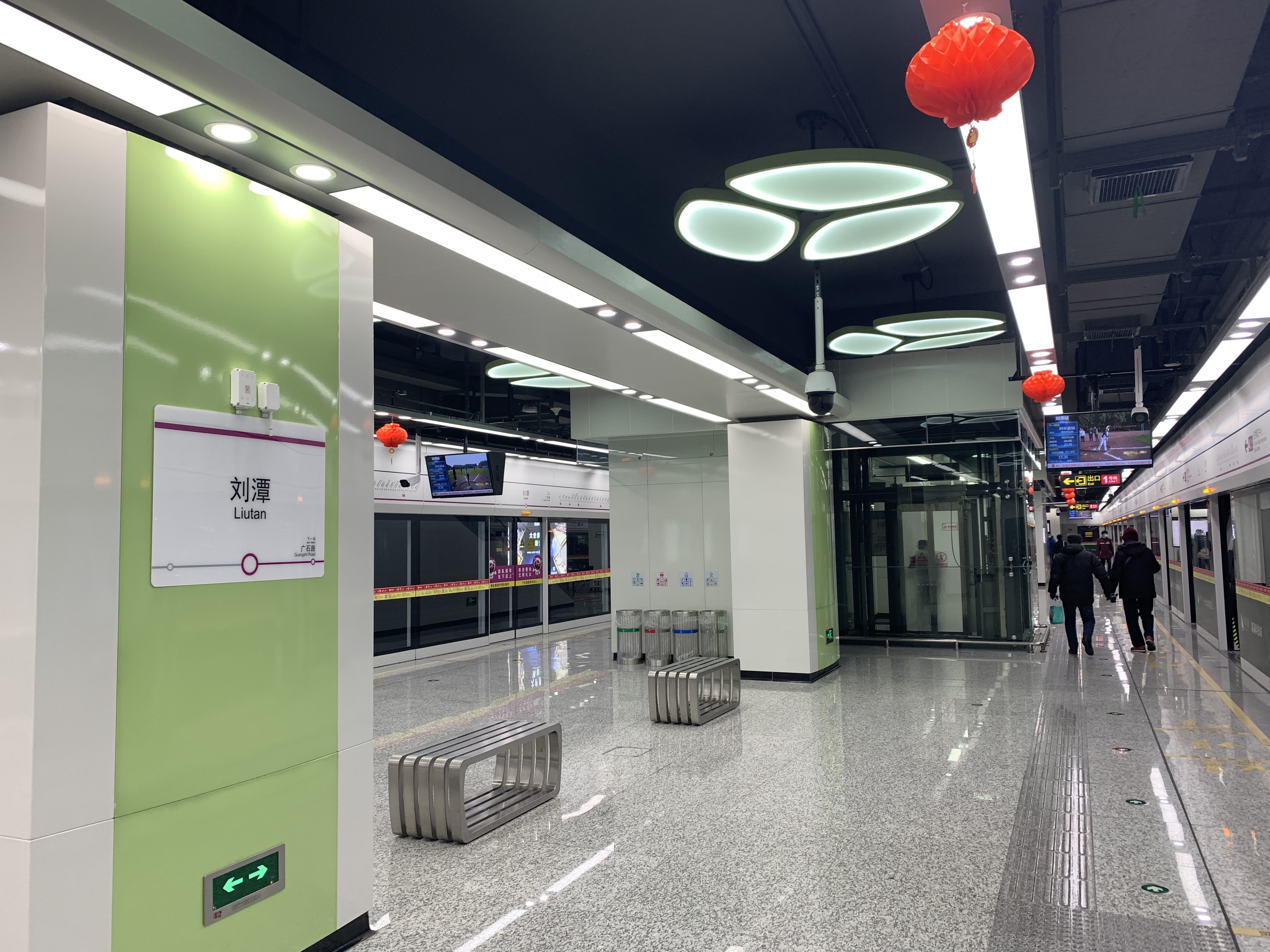
- Liutan station

Overview
- Status: Operational
- Owner: Wuxi Government
- Locale: Wuxi, Jiangsu, China
- Termini: Liutan; Wuxi Taihu International Expo Center
- Stations: 18

Service
- Type: Rapid transit
- System: Wuxi Metro
- Services: 1
- Operator(s): Wuxi Metro

History
- Opened: 17 December 2021; 3 years ago

Technical
- Line length: 25.4 km (15.8 mi)
- Number of tracks: 2
- Character: Underground
- Track gauge: 1,435 mm (4 ft 8 1/2 in)
- Electrification: 1,500 V DC third rail

Line 4 of the Wuxi Metro (Chinese: 无锡地铁4号线) is a rapid transit line in Wuxi, China.

Construction on the first phase of the line began on 28 March 2017. It opened on 17 December 2021.

== Opening timeline ==
Segment	Commencement	Length	Station(s)	Name
Liutan — Wuxi Taihu International Expo Center	17 December 2021	25.4 km (15.8 mi)	18	Phase 1

== Stations (north to south) ==
Station name		Connections	Distance km		Location
English	Chinese	Connections	Distance km		Location
Liutan	刘潭	1	0	0	Huishan
Guangshi Road	广石路				Liangxi
Huangxiang	黄巷				Liangxi
Sheng'an	盛岸	3			Liangxi
Huishan Ancient Town	惠山古镇				Liangxi
Qingshanwan Rongjun Hospital	青山湾荣院				Binhu
Heliekou	河埒口	2			Binhu
Xiyuanlong	西园弄				Binhu
Wuxi Sports Center	体育中心				Binhu
Xiajiabian	夏家边				Binhu
Lihudaqiao	蠡湖大桥				Binhu
Wuxi Grand Theater	大剧院				Binhu
Wuhu Avenue	五湖大道				Binhu
Zhouxinyuan	周新苑				Binhu
Civic Center	市民中心	1			Binhu
Wudu Road	吴都路				Binhu
Fengrun Road	丰润道				Binhu
Wuxi Taihu International Expo Center	博览中心				Binhu
