= Line S1 (Wuxi Metro) =

Metro line in Wuxi, China

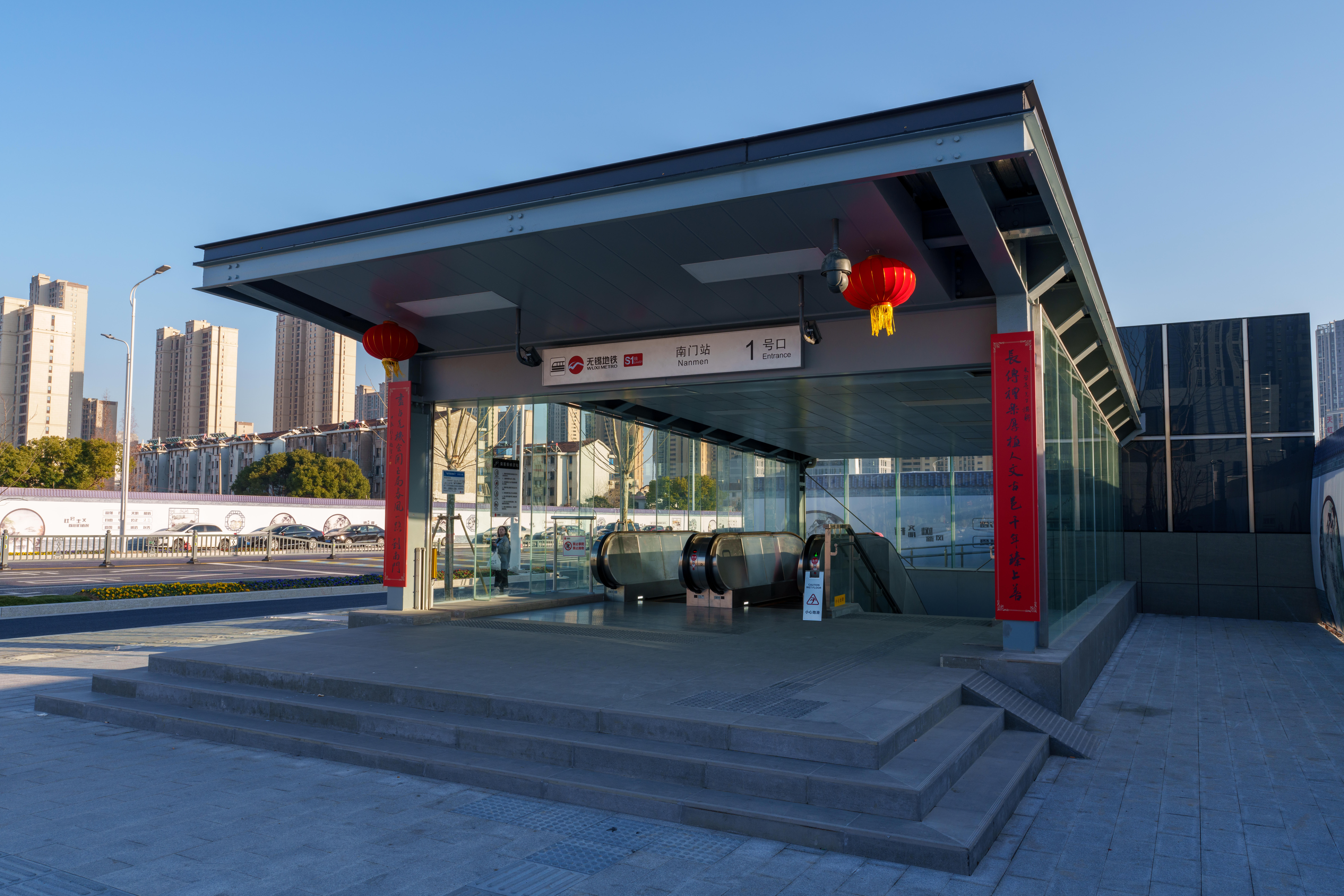
- Exit 1 of Nanmen station

Overview
- Native name: 无锡地铁S1线
- Status: Active
- Locale: Wuxi, Jiangsu China
- Termini: Jiangyin Bund; Yanqiao (Note: Through service to Line 1)
- Stations: 10

Service
- Type: Inter-city rail, rapid transit
- System: Wuxi Metro
- Depot(s): Huashan depot
- Rolling stock: B trains

Technical
- Line length: 30.4 km (18.9 mi)
- Character: Underground, elevated
- Track gauge: Standard gauge
- Operating speed: 120 km/h (75 mph)

Xicheng Rail Transit Line S1 (Chinese: 锡澄轨道交通S1线; pinyin: Xī chéng guǐdào jiāotōng S1 xiàn), also known as Wuxi Metro Line S1 (Chinese: 无锡地铁S1线; pinyin: Wúxī dìtiě S1 xiàn), Wuxi to Jiangyin Intercity Rail Transit (Chinese: 无锡至江阴城际轨道交通; pinyin: Wúxī zhì jiāngyīn chéng jì guǐdào jiāotōng), or Xichengjing Intercity (Chinese: 锡澄靖城际; pinyin: Xī chéng jìng chéng jì), is a line connecting and Wuxi urban area and Jiangyin, as part of the Jiangsu Yangtze Metropolitan Belt intercity railway. It officially began operations on 31 January 2024.

== Introduction ==
Wuxi Metro Line S1 starts from Jiangyin Bund station in Jiangyin. It runs along Anyuugang Road, Hongqiao Road, and Xu Xiake Avenue in Jiangyin. After entering Huishan District, Wuxi, it walks along Huishan Avenue and connects to Wuxi Metro Line 1 at Yanqiao station, in Huishan District, Wuxi. The total length of this line is 30.4km, including 10.5km of underground lines, 0.2km of transition sections, and 19.7km of elevated lines. It has 10 stations, including 5 underground stations and 4 above ground stations.

== History ==
In April 2012, Wuxi Metro Line S1 was approved for construction by the National Development and Reform Commission in conjunction with the "Jiangsu Province Intercity Rail Transit Network Plan for Urban Agglomerations Along the River (2012-2020)". In the plan, this line is named Wuxi-Jiangyin-Jingjiang Line Wuxi-Jiangyin Section, with a total length of 31 kilometers, and is planned to be implemented between 2012 and 2015.

In October 2019, work on the S1 line was formally approved, and it officially began construction.

In 2020, the Jiangyin to Jingjiang section of the S1 line was included in the Yangtze River Delta multi-level rail transit system plan that is being compiled. In the same year, the Xicheng intercity railway was fully started, and the main projects of Jiangyin Bund Station, Jiangyin Bund Station-Zhongshan Park Station section ventilation shaft, Zhongshan Park Station, and Nanmen Station officially obtained the "Construction Engineering Construction Permit".

On 27 December 2022, the S1 line right-of-way was fully constructed, and post-station construction such as track laying and installation began.

From 20 to 22 January 2024, a free trial ride will be held.

On 31 January 2024, the line was opened.

== Stations ==
Station №	Services		Station name		Connections	Distance km		Location
Station №	Local	Rapid	English	Chinese	Connections	Distance km		Location
LS110	●	●	Jiangyin Bund	江阴外滩				Jiangyin
LS109	●	●	Zhongshan Park	中山公园				Jiangyin
LS108	●	●	Nanmen	南门				Jiangyin
LS107	●	●	Jiangyin TCM Hospital	江阴中医院				Jiangyin
LS106	●	●	Jiangyin Railway Station	江阴高铁站	KYH			Jiangyin
LS105	●	|	Nanzha	南闸				Jiangyin
LS104	●	|	Qiaoqi	峭岐				Jiangyin
LS103	●	|	Qingyang	青阳				Jiangyin
LS102	|	|	Xiakewan Science City (reserved station)	霞客湾科学城				Jiangyin
LS101	●	|	Mazhen	马镇				Jiangyin
L101	●	●	Yanqiao	堰桥		0.00	0.00	Huishan
↓ Through service to Line 1↓
