= Wuxi Mosque =

Mosque in Wuxi, Jiangsu, China

- 无锡清真寺
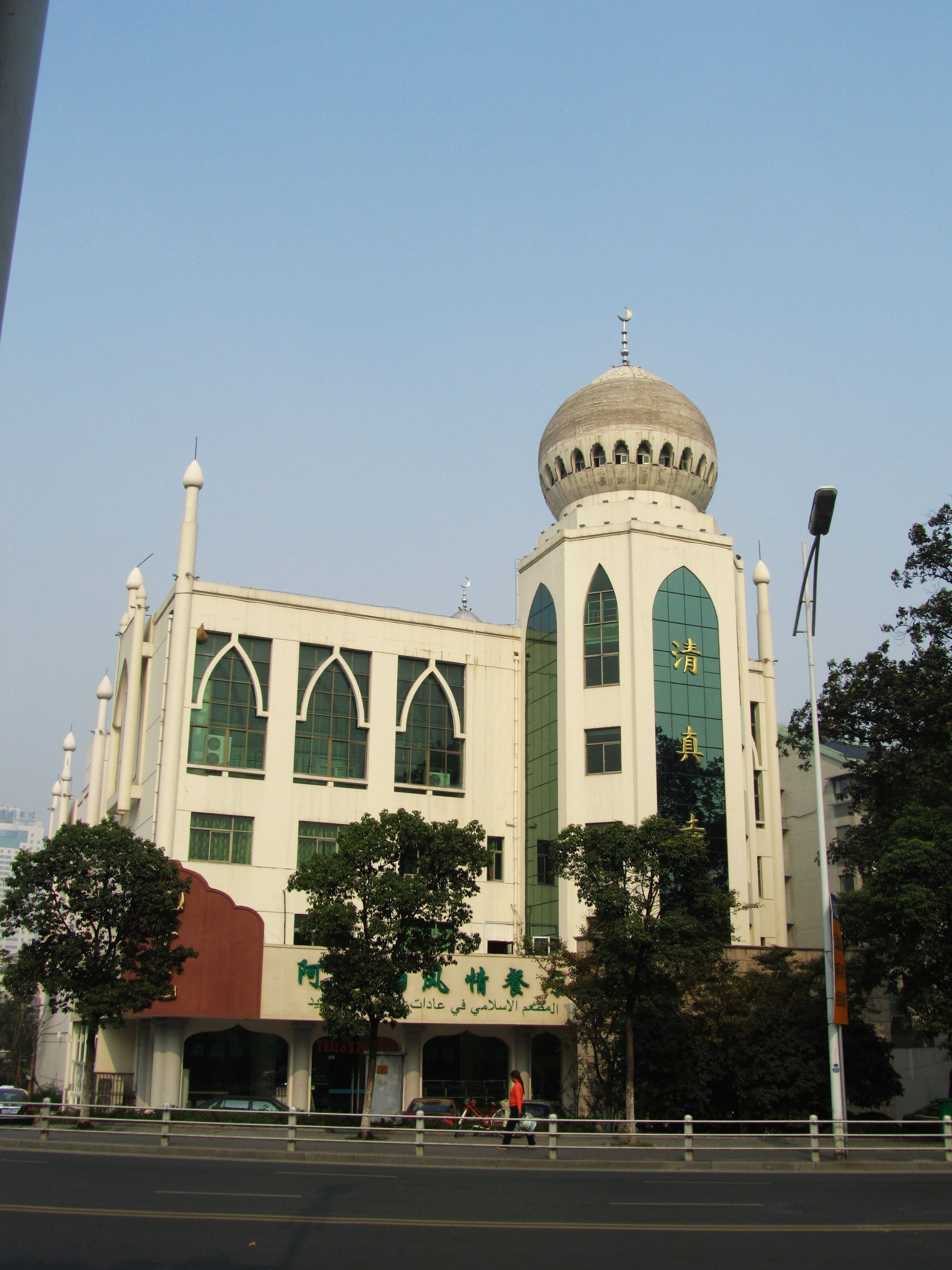

- Location of the mosque in Jiangsu

Religion
- Affiliation: Sunni Islam
- Ecclesiastical or organizational status: Mosque
- Status: Active

Location
- Location: 586 Jiefang South Road, Liangxi, Wuxi, Jiangsu
- Country: China
- Interactive map of Wuxi Mosque
- Coordinates: 31°34′09″N 120°17′46″E

Architecture
- Type: Mosque
- Style: Islamic
- Completed: 1921 (original); 1999 (current)

Specifications
- Dome: 1
- Minaret: 1
- Site area: 2,182 m^{2} (23,490 sq ft)

The Wuxi Mosque (simplified Chinese: 无锡清真寺; traditional Chinese: 無錫清真寺; pinyin: Wúxī Qīngzhēnsì) is a mosque in Liangxi District, Wuxi City, in the Jiangsu province of China.

== Overview ==
The mosque was constructed in 1921. In 1999, the mosque was reconstructed to its current shape of the building.

The mosque was constructed in the Islamic architectural style and it set on a 2,182-square-metre (23,490 sq ft) site.

== Transportation ==
The mosque is accessible within walking distance west of Nanchan Temple Station of Wuxi Metro.

== See also ==
Wuxi Mosque
- Traditional Chinese: 無錫清真寺
- Simplified Chinese: 无锡清真寺
Transcriptions
Standard Mandarin
- Hanyu Pinyin: Wúxī Qīngzhēnsì

- Islam in China
- List of mosques in China
