= Jiangsu Yangtze Metropolitan Belt intercity railway =

Railway network in Jiangsu, China

Jiangsu Yangtze MIR

Overview
- Locale: Nanjing, Zhenjiang, Changzhou, Wuxi, Suzhou, Yangzhou, Taizhou, Nantong
- Transit type: High-speed rail Higher-speed rail rapid transit
- Number of lines: 8 total

Operation
- Began operation: 1 July 2014
- Operator: China Railway/China Railway High-speed

Technical
- Track gauge: 1,435 mm (4 ft 8 1/2 in) standard gauge
- Electrification: 25 kV AC (CRH Line); 1.5 kV DC (Nanjing Metro Line) overhead lines

Jiangsu Yangtze Metropolitan Belt intercity railway
- Simplified Chinese: 江苏沿江城市带城际轨道交通
- Traditional Chinese: 江蘇沿江城市带城際軌道交通
Transcriptions
Standard Mandarin
- Hanyu Pinyin: Jiāngsū Yánjiāng Chéngshì Dài Chéngjì Guǐdào Jiāotōng

Jiangsu Yangtze Metropolitan Belt intercity railway system is a network of 8 regional railways surrounding southern parts of Jiangsu province, China. It is a plan for the gradual implementation of a regional rail system across the region. The system involves Nanjing, Zhenjiang, Changzhou, Wuxi, Suzhou, Yangzhou, Taizhou, Nantong, it aims to form a convenient, fast, safe and efficient intercity rail transportation network.

== Intercity railway routes ==
=== Operational lines ===
- Shanghai–Nanjing intercity railway
- Line S1 (Nanjing Metro) and Line S9 (Nanjing Metro) (together forms the Nanjing–Gaochun intercity railway)
- Line S3 (Nanjing Metro) (Nanjing–He County intercity railway)
- Line S8 (Nanjing Metro) (Nanjing–Tianchang intercity railway)

=== Lines under construction or planned ===
- Line S6 (Nanjing Metro) (Nanjing–Jurong intercity railway)
- Line S5 (Nanjing Metro) (Nanjing–Yizheng–Yangzhou intercity railway)
- Line S1 (Wuxi Metro) (Wuxi–Jiangyin intercity railway)
- Line S2 (Wuxi Metro) (Wuxi–Yixing intercity railway)
- Suzhou–Wuxi Shuofang Airport intercity railway
