= Xishan Senior High School =

High school in Jiangsu Province, China

- Traditional Chinese: 江蘇省錫山高級中學
- Simplified Chinese: 江苏省锡山高级中学
Transcriptions
Standard Mandarin
- Hanyu Pinyin: Jiāngsū Shěng Xīshān Gāojí Zhōngxué
Wu
- Romanization: Kongsu Sang Siksae Kaujih tzungghok

Jiangsu Xishan Senior High School, commonly known as Xishan Senior High School, is a high school in Xishan District, Wuxi, Jiangsu Province, China. It was founded in 1907. The school emphasises science and technology; in 2006, they invested over RMB30,000,000 in computing and network facilities.

== History ==
Jiangsu Xishan Senior High School was founded in 1907 by Kuang Zhongmo, a reputable local entrepreneur. Kuang started his career in cotton spinning and expanded his business into real state and finance. He founded Kuang's Senior High School in his home town, the Yong's Villa, which was the predecessor of Jiangsu Xishan Senior High School. Kuang's Senior High provided local teenagers with both traditional Confucianism education and modern subjects, such as maths and physics.

During the World War II, Kuang's major possession, the Penglai Market in downtown Shanghai, was destroyed by Japanese army, and the Kuang's Senior High was forced to close down. In 1952, three years after the end of the China Civil War, the local Wuxi government decided to rebuild Kuang's Senior High School, both its campus and the great reputation of the Kuang's education. The Kuang's Senior High School was renamed the Senior High of Wuxi County. In 1996, it was renamed again as Jiangsu Xishan Senior High School, and became a public high school run by the Jiangsu Province Government.

Now, Jiangsu Xishan Senior High School has three campuses, Yanqiao Campus (main campus), Yang's Villa Campus (old campus), and Dongting Campus. In the main campus, there are three classroom buildings, a lab building, a library building, and administration building, an art building, a gym, an athletics field, 32 basketball courts, 10 dorm buildings and two student cafeterias. The school is best known for liberal and art education. The political science, history, geography programs, and especially Chinese literature, are among the top in the province. Jiangpeng Tang, the principle of the Xishan Senior High, together with four other teachers from Xishan Senior High, are editors of the Jiangsu Standard Chinese Textbook Series.

== Addresses of the three campuses ==
Yanqiao Campus (main campus): No.1 Zhenghe Ave, Huishan District, Wuxi, Jiangsu Province

Yang's Villa Campus (old campus):

Dongting Campus: Xihu St. @ Bozhuang St.

== Picture of Teachers ==
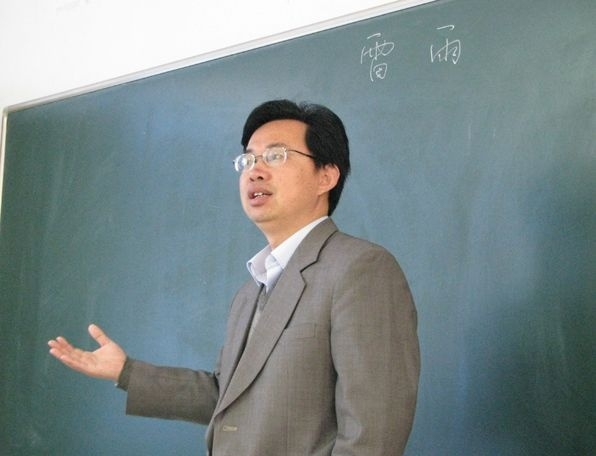
Leizhen Xia, Chinese teacher;夏雷震，语文教师

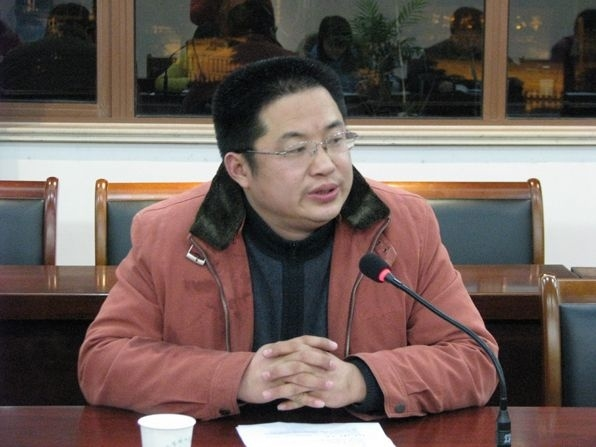
Xiaohong Zhu, geography teacher;朱晓宏 地理教师

== Picture of the Main Campus ==
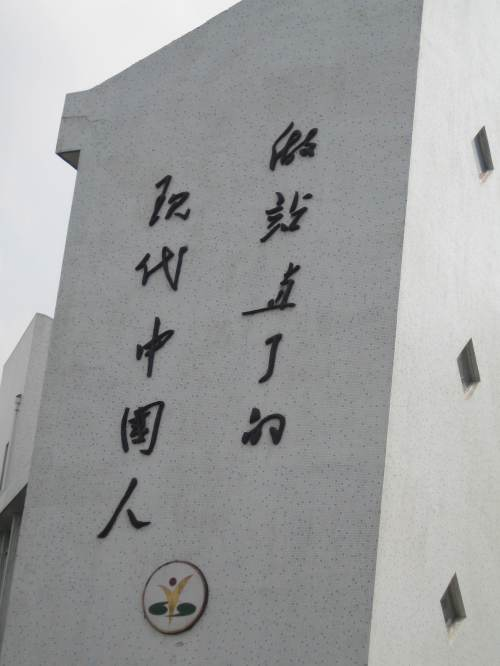
The school motto: "Stand Straight Like a Chinese Does."

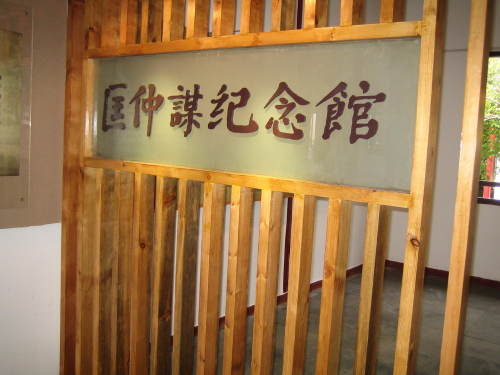
Memorial to Kuang Zhongmo

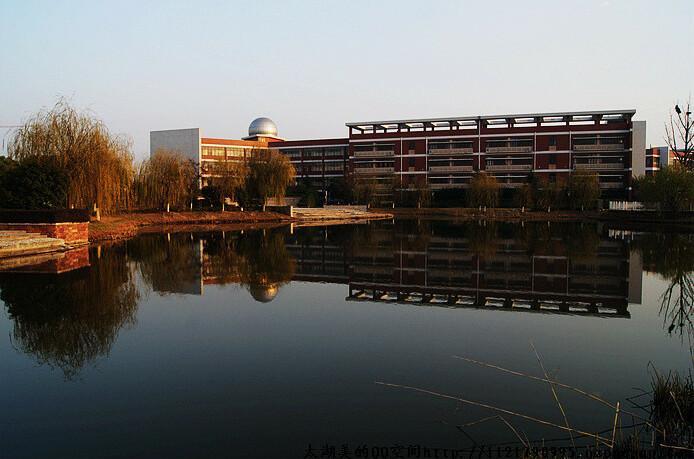
The observatory and lab building

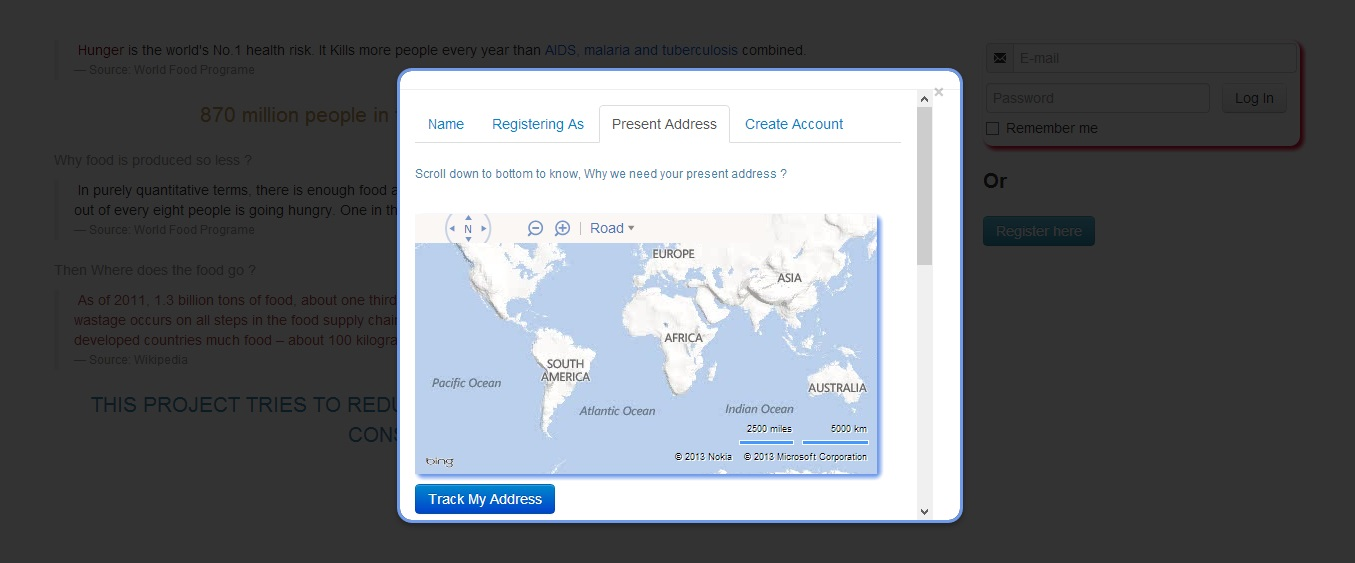
Athletics field and gym

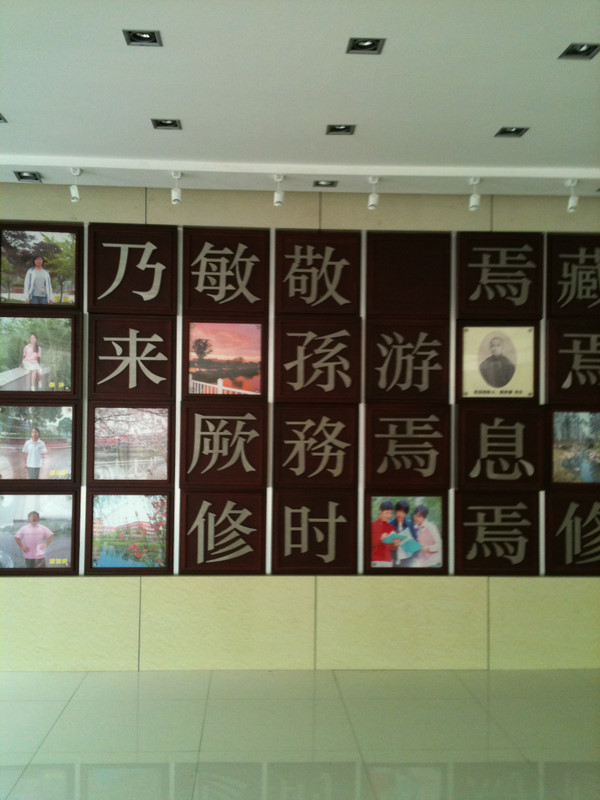
A relief sculpture
