= Huishan, Wuxi =

Huishan 惠山区
- District
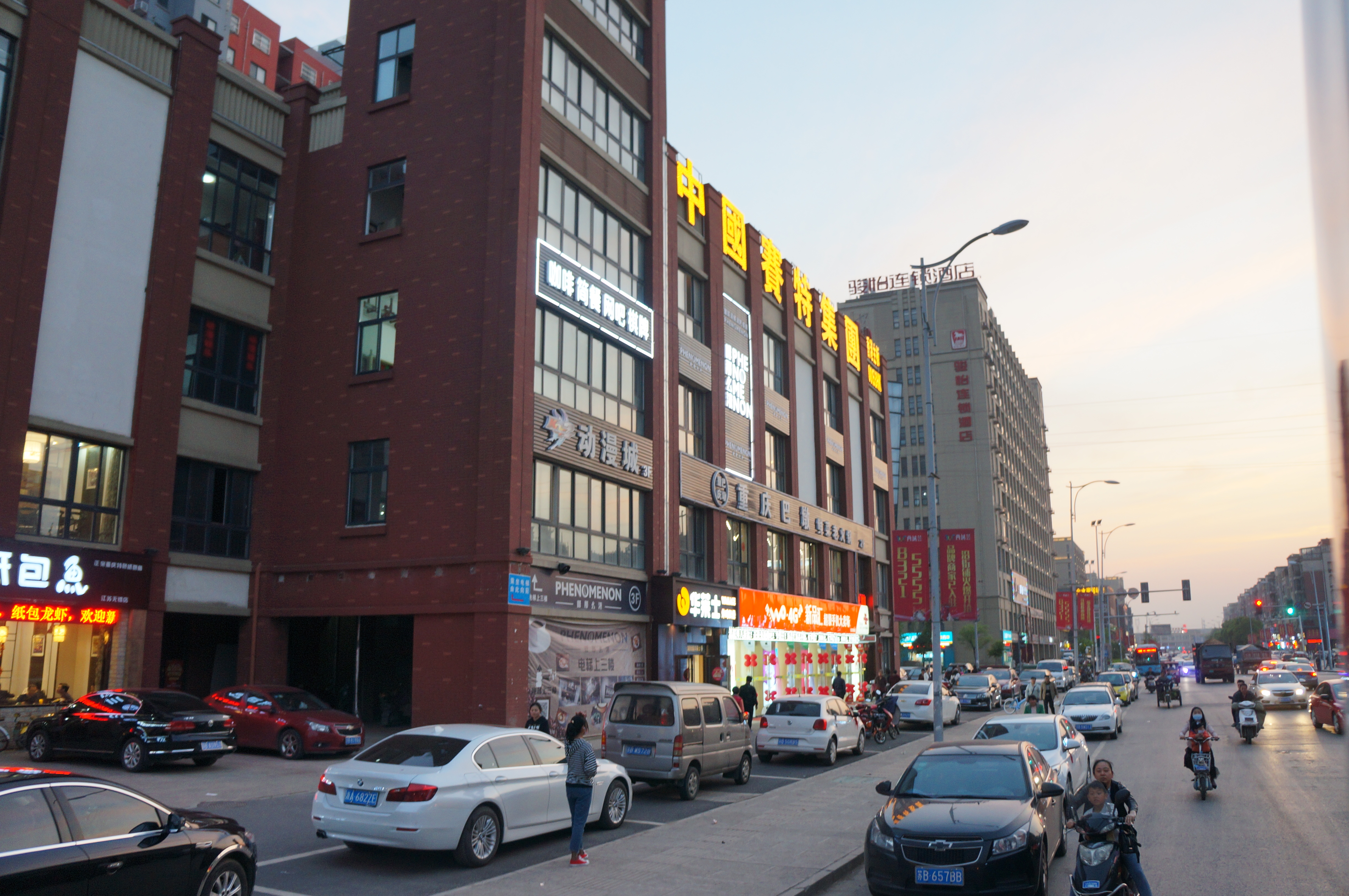
- Huishan District in April 2017

- Location in Jiangsu
- Coordinates: 31°39′19″N 120°13′24″E
- Country: People's Republic of China
- Province: Jiangsu
- Prefecture-level city: Wuxi

Area
  - Total: 327.12 km^{2} (126.30 sq mi)

Population (2012)
  - Total: 431,900
  - Density: 1,320/km^{2} (3,420/sq mi)
- Time zone: UTC+8 (China Standard)
- Postal code: 214100

Huishan District (simplified Chinese: 惠山区; traditional Chinese: 惠山區; pinyin: Huìshān Qū) is one of five urban districts of Wuxi, Jiangsu province, China.

The total area of the district is 327.12 km^{2}. In 2006 the population was 388,957.

== Administrative divisions ==
In the present, Huishan District has 5 subdistricts and 2 towns.

5 subdistricts

- Yanqiao (堰桥街道)
- Chang'an (长安街道)
- Qianqiao (钱桥街道)
- Qianzhou (前洲街道)
- Yuqi (玉祁街道)

2 towns

- Luoshe (洛社镇)
- Yangshan (阳山镇)

== Geography ==
Huishan Dist. is located at the north of Wuxi, and on the border with Jiangyin on its north.

== Education ==
One of famous provincial level middle school is Jiangsu Xishan Senior High School , which makes contribution for the junior and senior level of middle school education for Wuxi city, especially for Huishan District of Wuxi.

== Preference ==
Xishan Senior High School
