= Yanqiao station =

Wuxi Metro station

Coordinates: 31°40′38″N 120°18′37″E

Yanqiao 堰桥
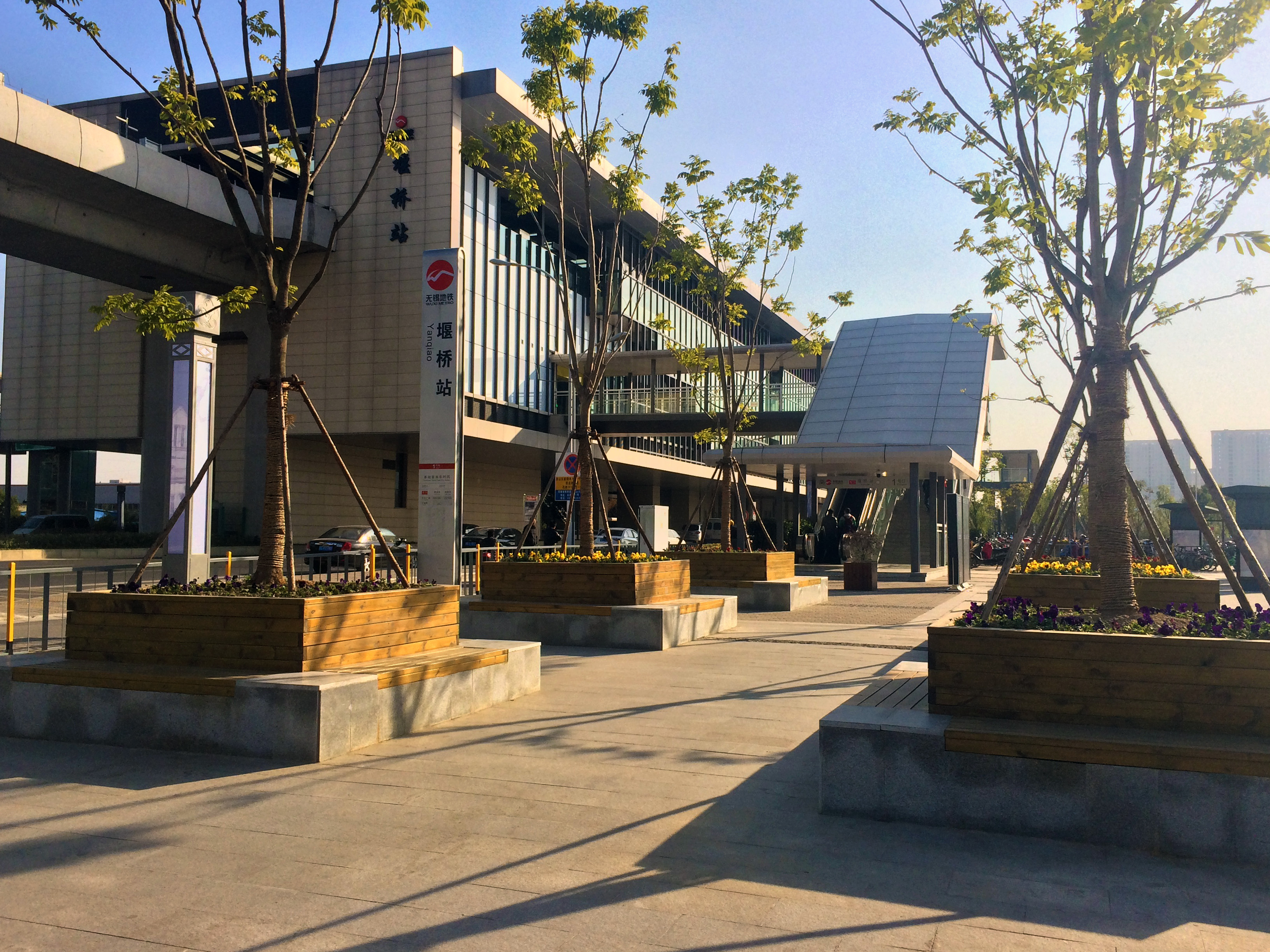

General information
- Location: Huishan District, Wuxi, Jiangsu; China
- Operated by: Wuxi Metro Corporation
- Lines: Line 1 Line S1
- Platforms: 2 (2 side platforms)

Construction
- Structure type: Elevated

History
- Opened: 1 July 2014 (Line 1); 31 January 2024 (Line S1)

Services
Preceding station	Wuxi Metro	Following station
through to Line S1	Line 1	Xibei Canal towards Nanfangquan
Mazhen towards Jiangyin Bund	Line S1	through to Line 1
Location

Yanqiao Station (Chinese: 堰桥站) is a metro station on Line 1 and Line S1 of the Wuxi Metro. It began operations on 1 July 2014.

The station has a through service to Line S1, that began operations on 31 January 2024, also known as Wuxi-Jiangyin intercity railway (无锡至江阴城际轨道) or Xicheng line (锡澄线), towards Jiangyin (a county-level city administered by Wuxi).

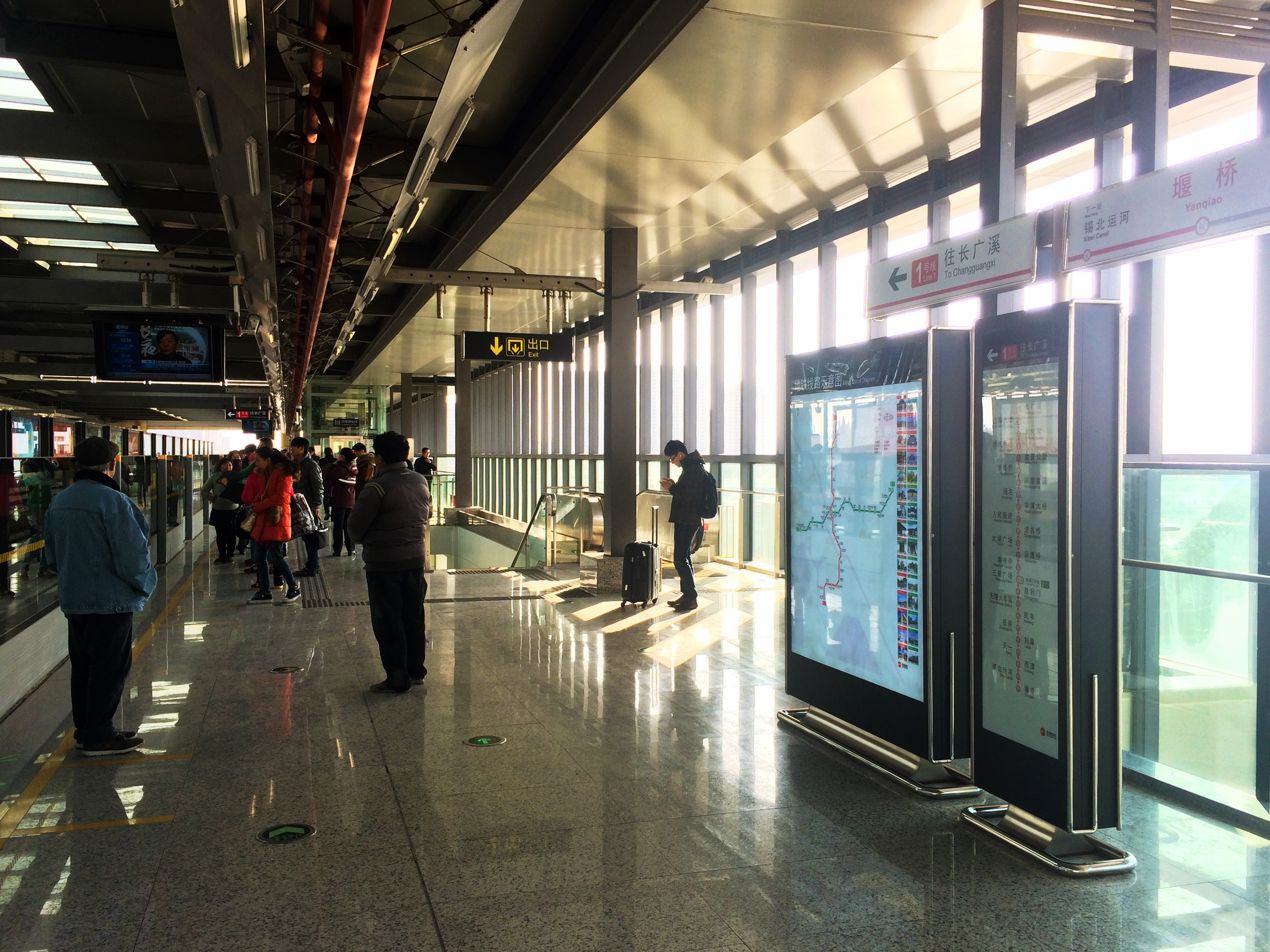
Platform

== Station layout ==
3F	Side platform, doors will open on the right
3F	Northbound	← Line S1 towards Jiangyin Bund
3F	Southbound	Line 1 towards Nanfangquan →
3F	Side platform, doors will open on the right

2F	Station hall	Service center, ticket vending machine, toilets, elevators

Ground
Ground	Equipment area	Exits

== Exits ==
This station has 4 exits.
