= Nanfangquan station =

Metro station in Wuxi, China

Coordinates: 31°26′19″N 120°16′1″E

Nanfangquan 南方泉
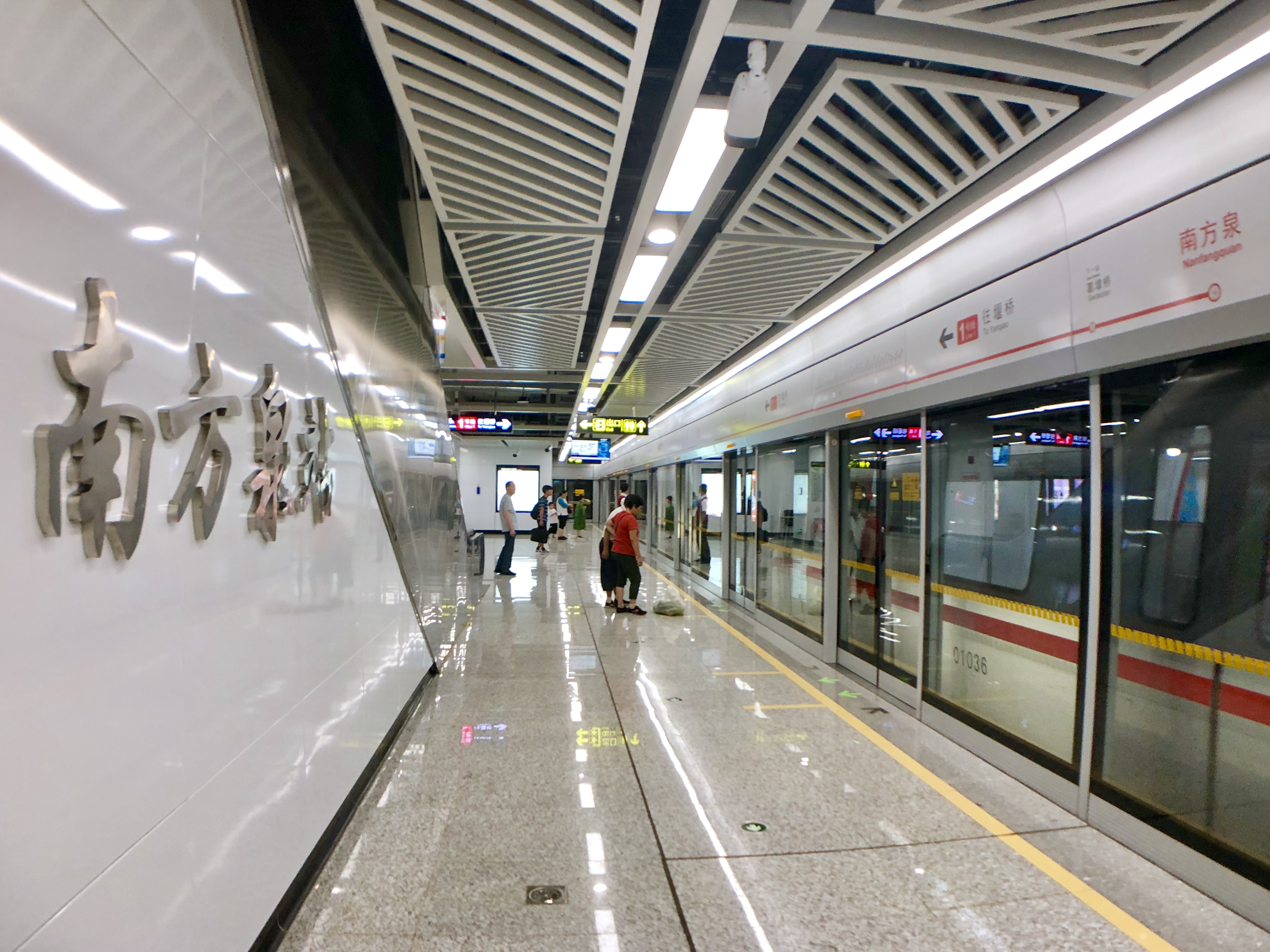
- Platform

General information
- Operator: Wuxi Metro
- Line: Line 1
- Platforms: 1 island platform

Other information
- Station code: L127

History
- Opened: 28 September 2019

Services
Preceding station	Wuxi Metro	Following station
Gedaiqiao towards Yanqiao	Line 1	Terminus
Location

Nanfangquan station is located at the intersection of Nanhu Road and Xinglong Road in Binhu District, Wuxi. It is the southern terminus of Wuxi Metro Line 1. The station was completed and put into operation on September 28, 2019, as part of its southern extension.

== Station overview ==
Nanfangquan station is the terminal station of Line 1. It is a standard island platform with two underground floors. The station exits Gedaiqiao station, goes south through the Xidahe Green Belt, and ends at a station on Nanhu Road. After arriving at the station, the train returns via a switchback line.
