= Xiaotaoyuan station =

Wuxi Metro station

Coordinates: 31°33′40″N 120°14′41″E

Xiaotaoyuan 小桃源
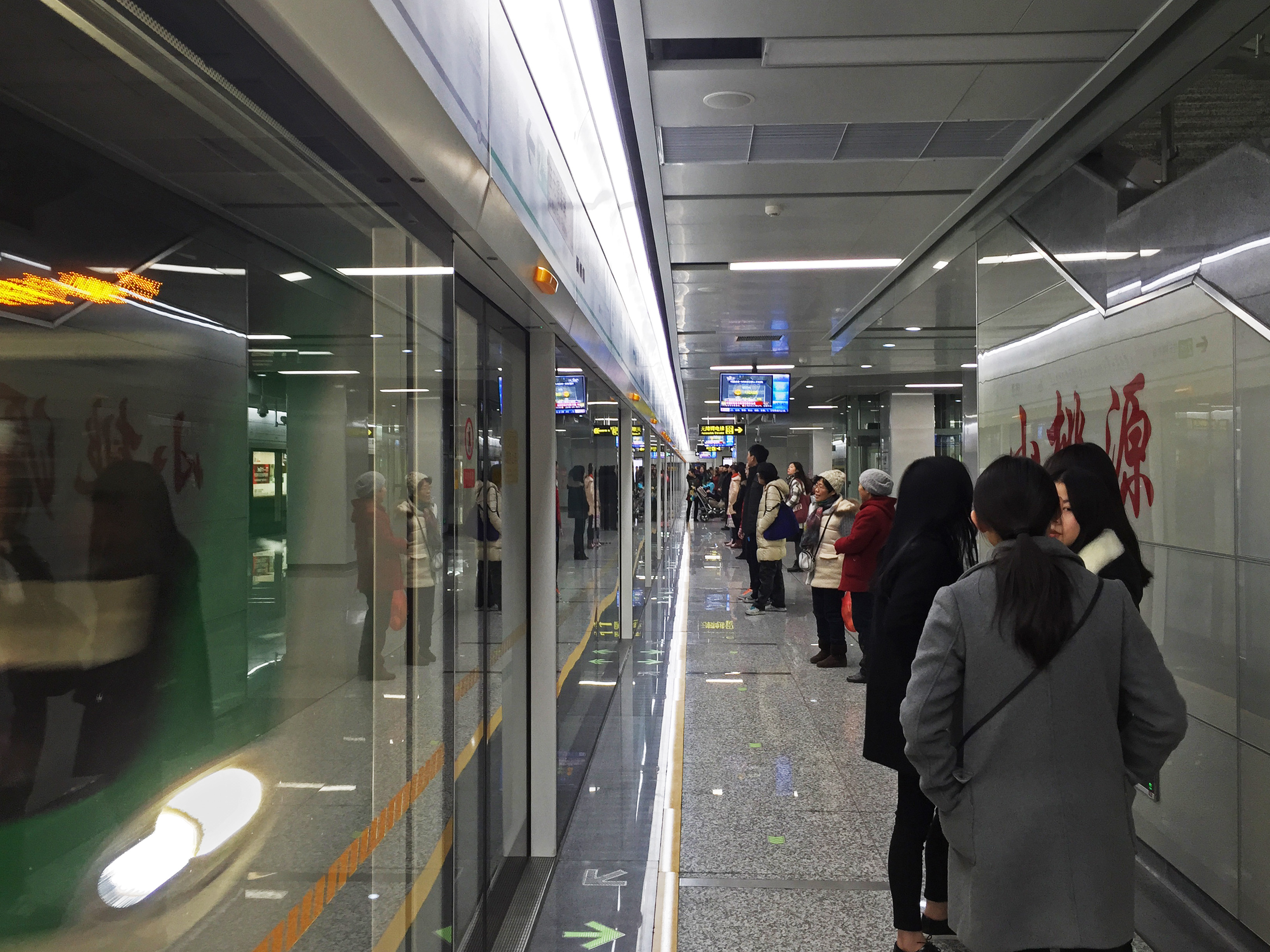
- Platform

General information
- Location: Binhu District, Wuxi, Jiangsu; China
- Operator: Wuxi Metro Corporation
- Line: Line 2
- Platforms: 2 (1 island platform)

Construction
- Structure type: Underground

History
- Opened: 28 December 2014

Services
Preceding station	Wuxi Metro	Following station
Rongxiang towards Meiyuan Kaiyuan Temple	Line 2	Heliekou towards Wuxi East Railway Station
Location

Xiaotaoyuan Station (Chinese: 小桃源站) is a metro station of Line 2 of the Wuxi Metro. It started operations on 28 December 2014.

== Station layout ==
Ground
Ground	Exits

B1	Station Hall	Service Center, Ticket vending machine, Toilet, Elevator, Shops
B2	West	←█ towards Meiyuan Kaiyuan Temple
B2	Island Platform, doors will open on the left
B2	East	█ towards Anzhen→

== Exits ==
There are 3 exits for this station.
