= Heliekou station =

Wuxi Metro station

Coordinates: 31°33′51″N 120°15′27″E

Heliekou 河埒口
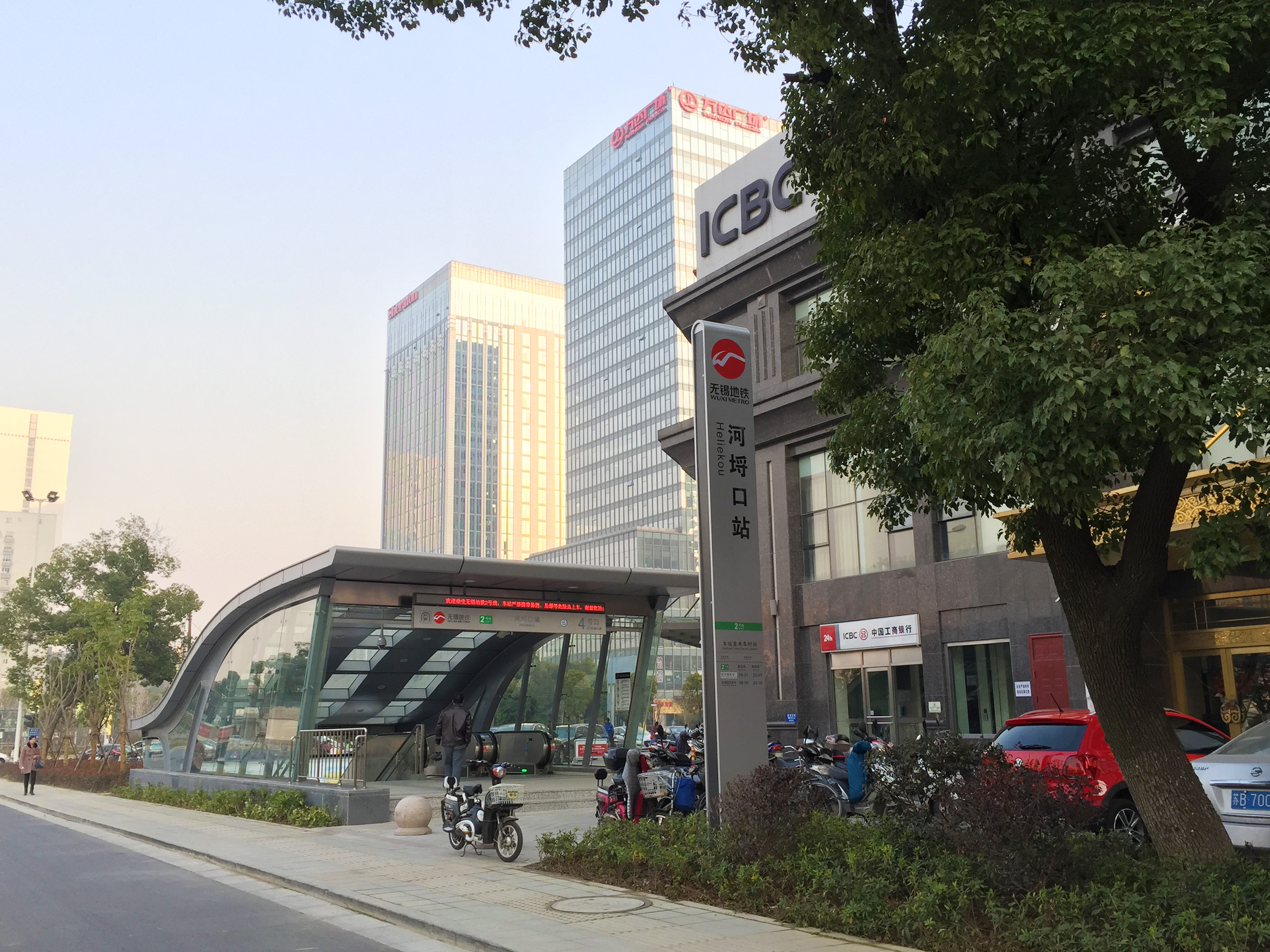
- Exit 4

General information
- Location: Binhu District, Wuxi, Jiangsu; China
- Operator: Wuxi Metro Corporation
- Lines: Line 2; Line 4
- Platforms: 4 (2 island platform)

Construction
- Structure type: Underground

History
- Opened: 28 December 2014 (Line 2); 17 December 2021 (Line 4)

Services
Preceding station	Wuxi Metro	Following station
Xiaotaoyuan towards Meiyuan Kaiyuan Temple	Line 2	Dawangji towards Wuxi East Railway Station
Qingshanwan Rongjun Hospital towards Liutan	Line 4	Xiyuanlong towards Wuxi Taihu International Expo Center
Location

Heliekou Station (Chinese: 河埒口站; pinyin: Hélièkǒu zhàn) is a metro station of Line 2 and Line 4 of Wuxi Metro. It started operations on 28 December 2014.

== Station layout ==
Ground
Ground	Exits

B1	Station Hall	Service Center, Ticket vending machine, Toilet, Elevator, Shops
B2	West	←█ towards Meiyuan Kaiyuan Temple
B2	Island Platform, doors will open on the left
B2	East	█ towards Anzhen→

B3	North	←█ towards Liutan
B3	Island Platform, doors will open on the left
B3	South	█ towards Wuxi Taihu International Expo Center→

== Exits ==
There are 9 exits for this station.

== Gallery ==
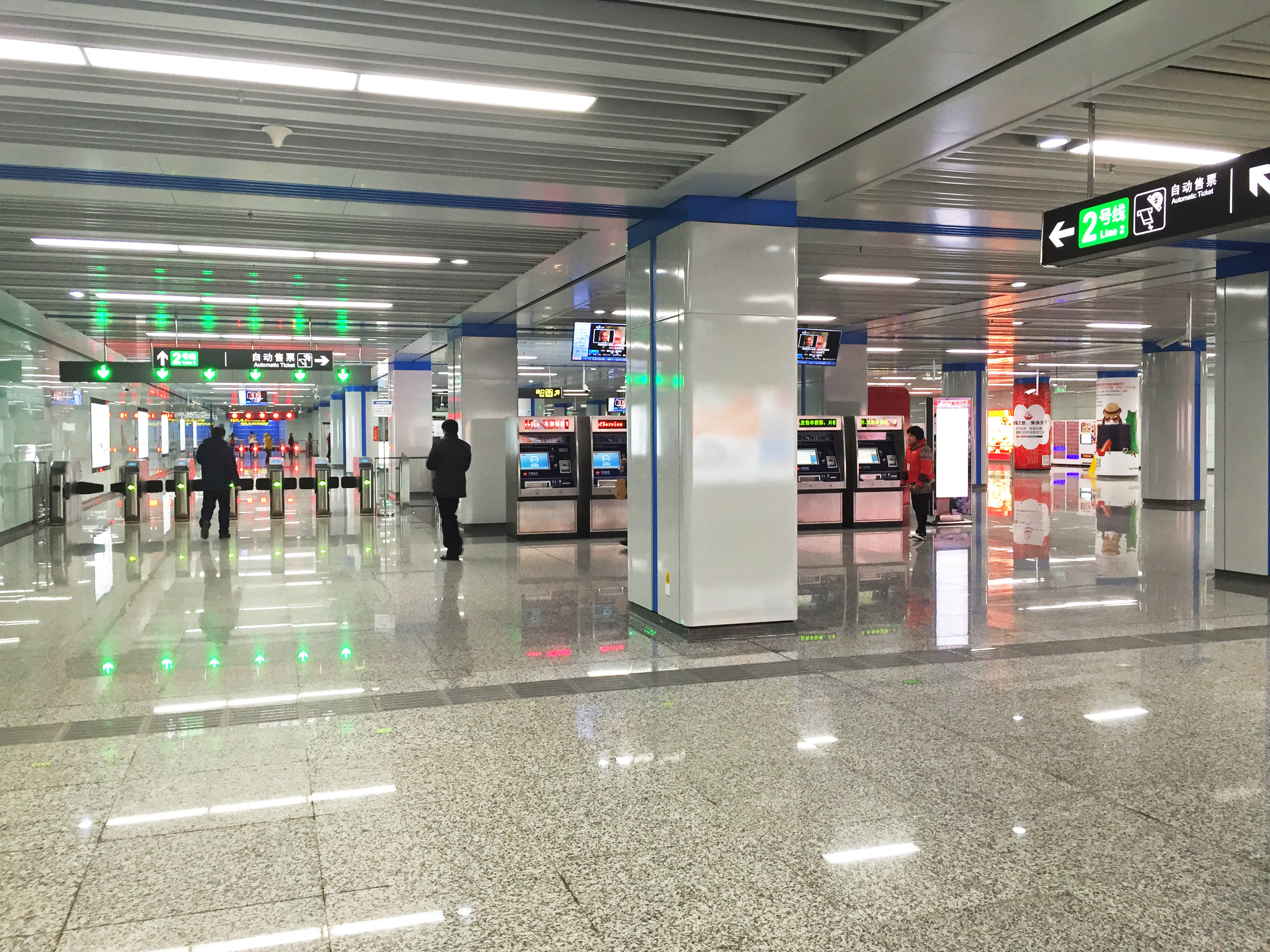
Station Hall

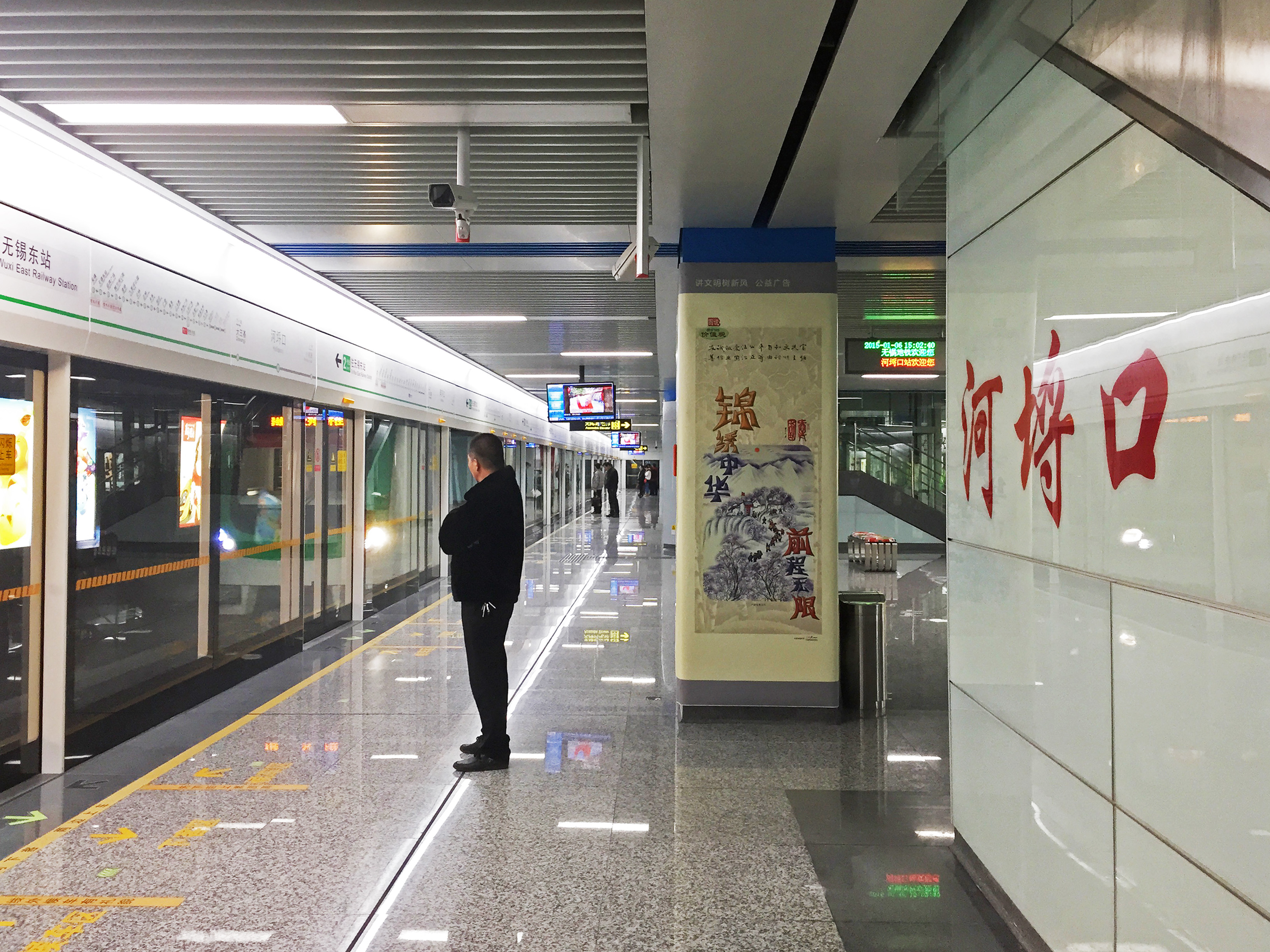
Platform
