= Baizhuang station =

Wuxi Metro station

Coordinates: 31°35′17″N 120°20′46″E

Baizhuang 柏庄
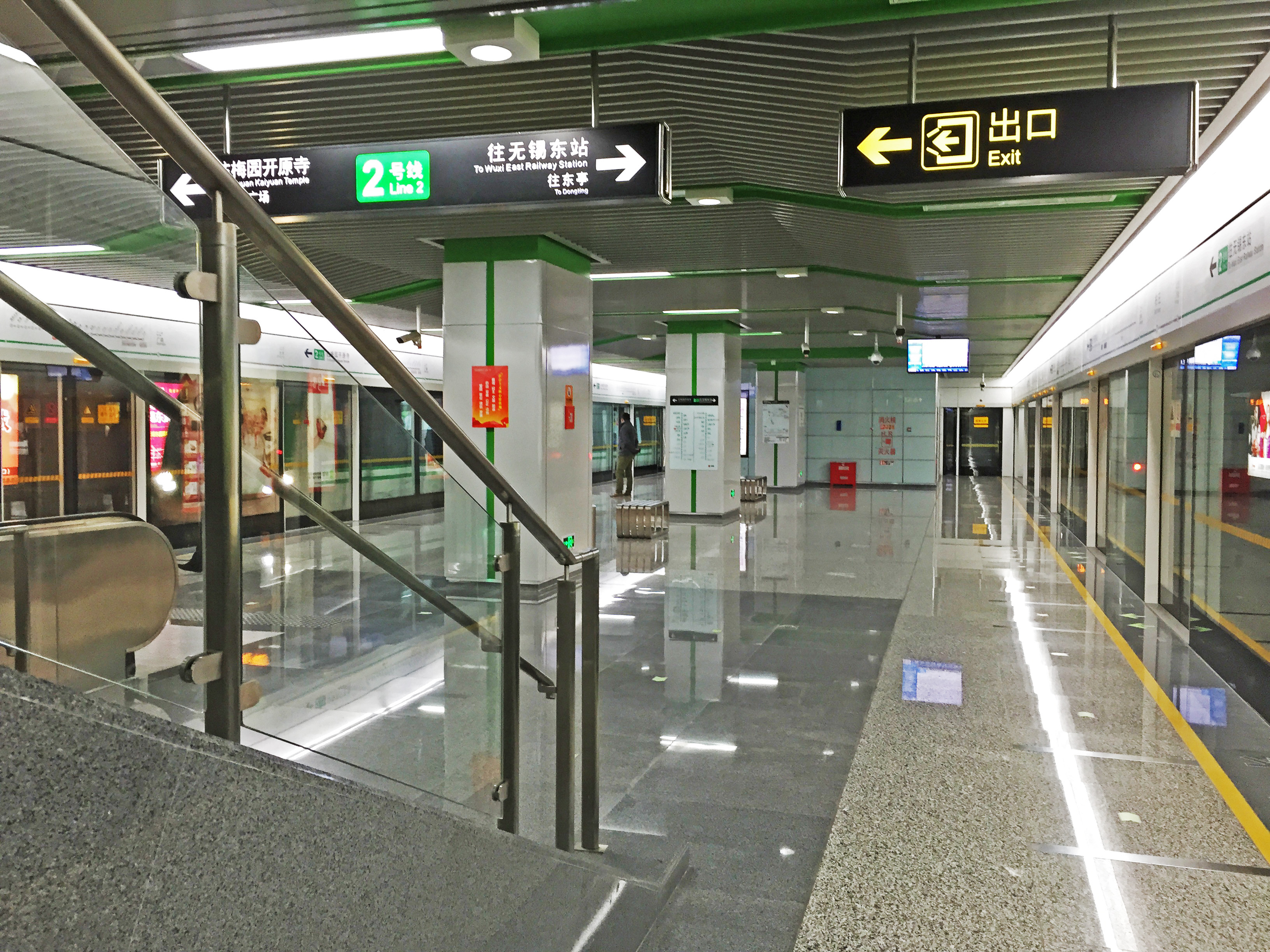
- Platform

General information
- Location: Xishan District, Wuxi, Jiangsu; China
- Operator: Wuxi Metro Corporation
- Line: Line 2
- Platforms: 2 (1 island platform)

Construction
- Structure type: Underground

History
- Opened: 28 December 2014

Services
| Preceding station | Wuxi Metro | Following station |
|---|---|---|
| Guangyi towards Meiyuan Kaiyuan Temple | Line 2 | Dongting towards Wuxi East Railway Station |
Location

Baizhuang Station (Chinese: 柏庄站) is a metro station of Line 2 of the Wuxi Metro. It started operations on 28 December 2014.

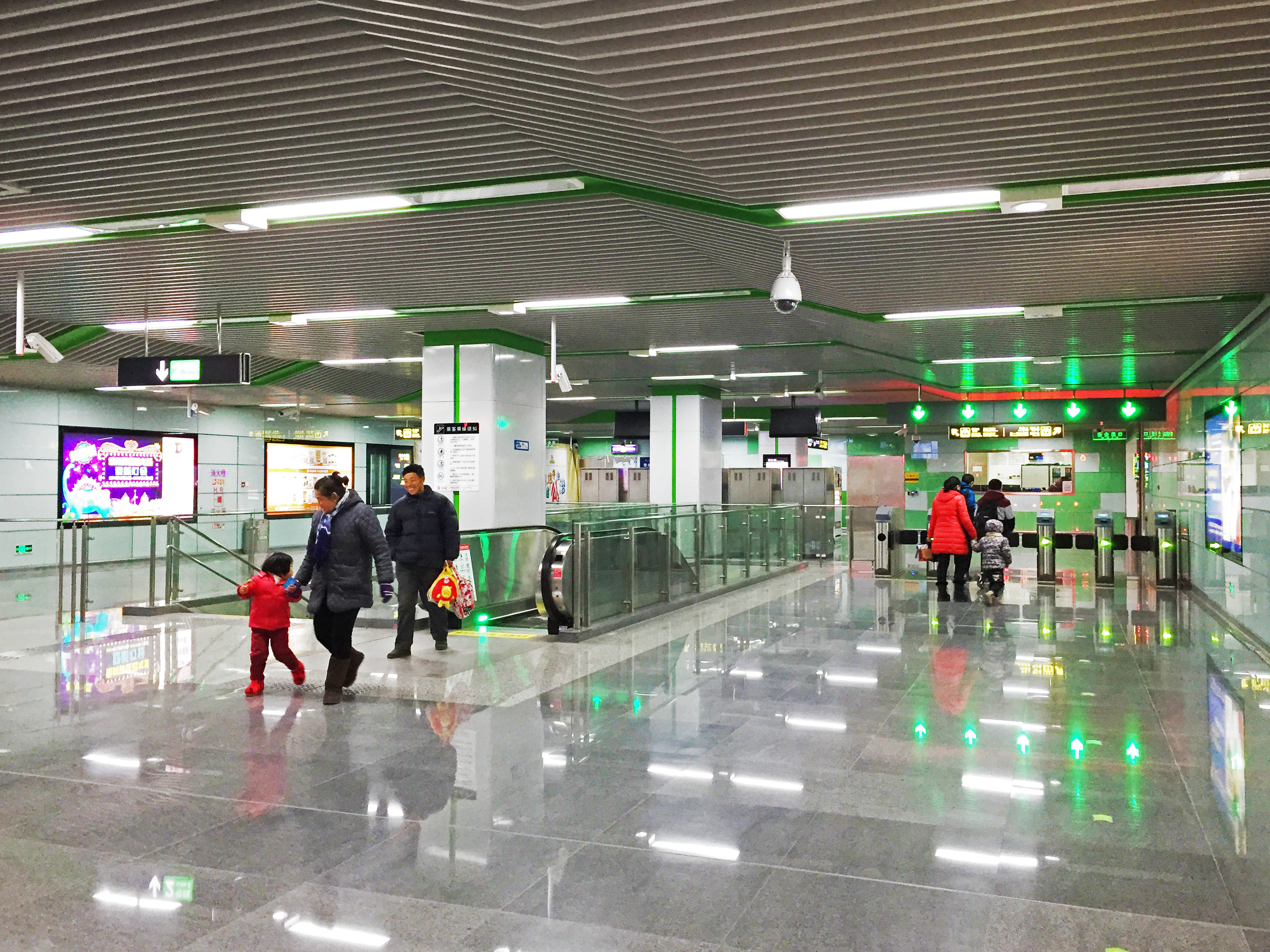
Station Hall

== Station layout ==
Ground
| Ground | Exits |

| B1 | Station Hall | Service Center, Ticket vending machine, Toilet, Elevator, Shops |
| B2 | West | ←█ towards Meiyuan Kaiyuan Temple |
| B2 | Island Platform, doors will open on the left |
| B2 | East | █ towards Anzhen→ |

== Exits ==
There are 4 exits for this station.
