= Jiulihe Park station =

Wuxi Metro station

Coordinates: 31°34′55″N 120°24′14″E

Jiulihe Park 九里河公园
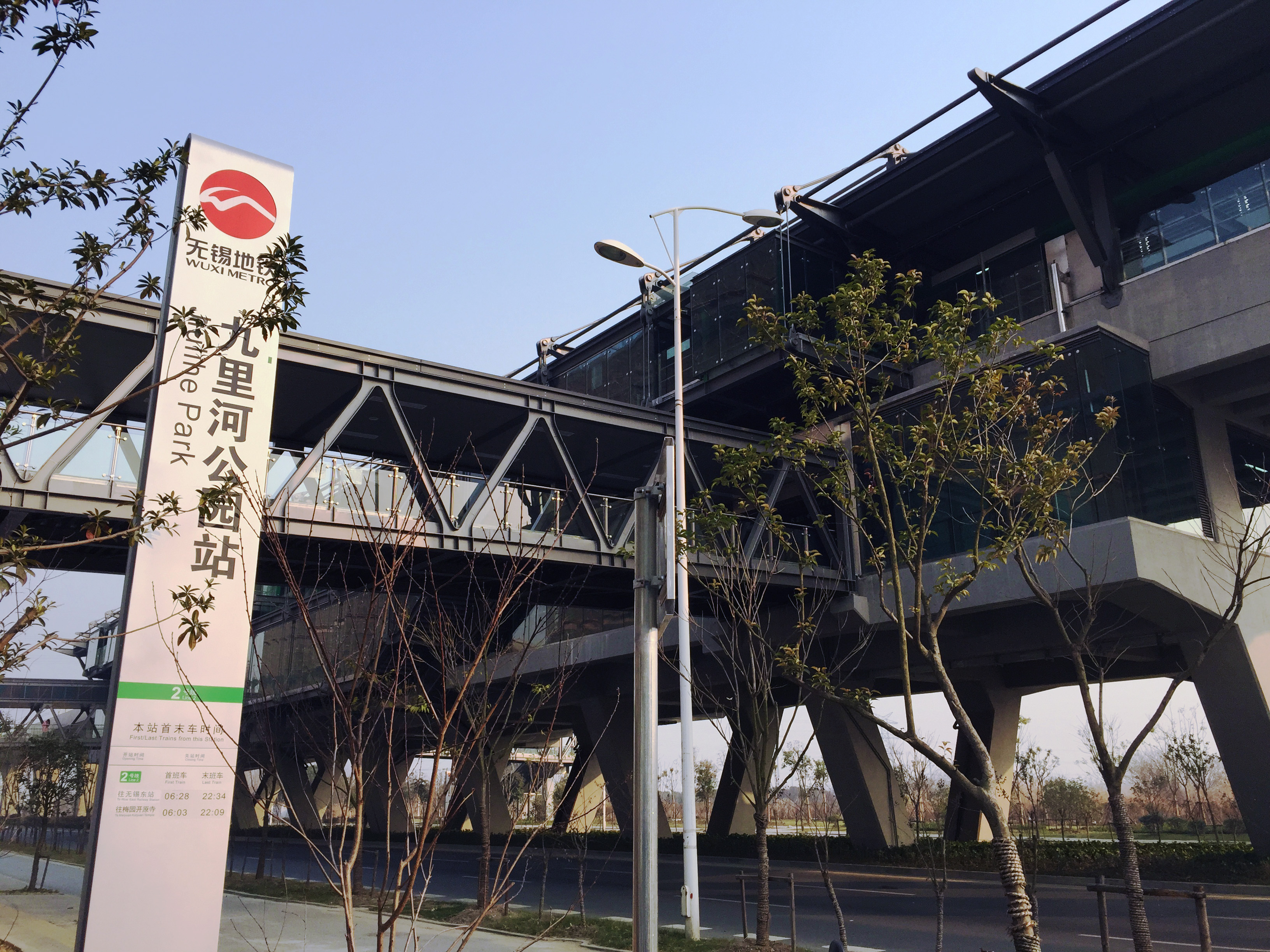

General information
- Location: Xishan District, Wuxi, Jiangsu; China
- Operator: Wuxi Metro Corporation
- Line: Line 2
- Platforms: 2 (1 side platform)

Construction
- Structure type: Elevated

History
- Opened: 28 December 2014

Services
Preceding station	Wuxi Metro	Following station
Yunlin towards Meiyuan Kaiyuan Temple	Line 2	Zhaqiao towards Wuxi East Railway Station
Location

Jiulihe Park Station (Chinese: 九里河公园站) is a metro station of Line 2 of the Wuxi Metro. It started operations on 28 December 2014.

== Station layout ==
3F	Side Platform, doors will open on the right
3F	West	←█ towards Meiyuan Kaiyuan Temple
3F	East	█ towards Anzhen→
3F	Side Platform, doors will open on the right

2F	Station Hall	Service Center, Ticket vending machine, Toilet, Elevator

Ground
Ground	Exits

B1	Equipment area

== Exits ==
There are 4 exits for this station.
