= Shangmadun station =

Wuxi Metro station

Coordinates: 31°35′03″N 120°18′58″E

Shangmadun 上马墩
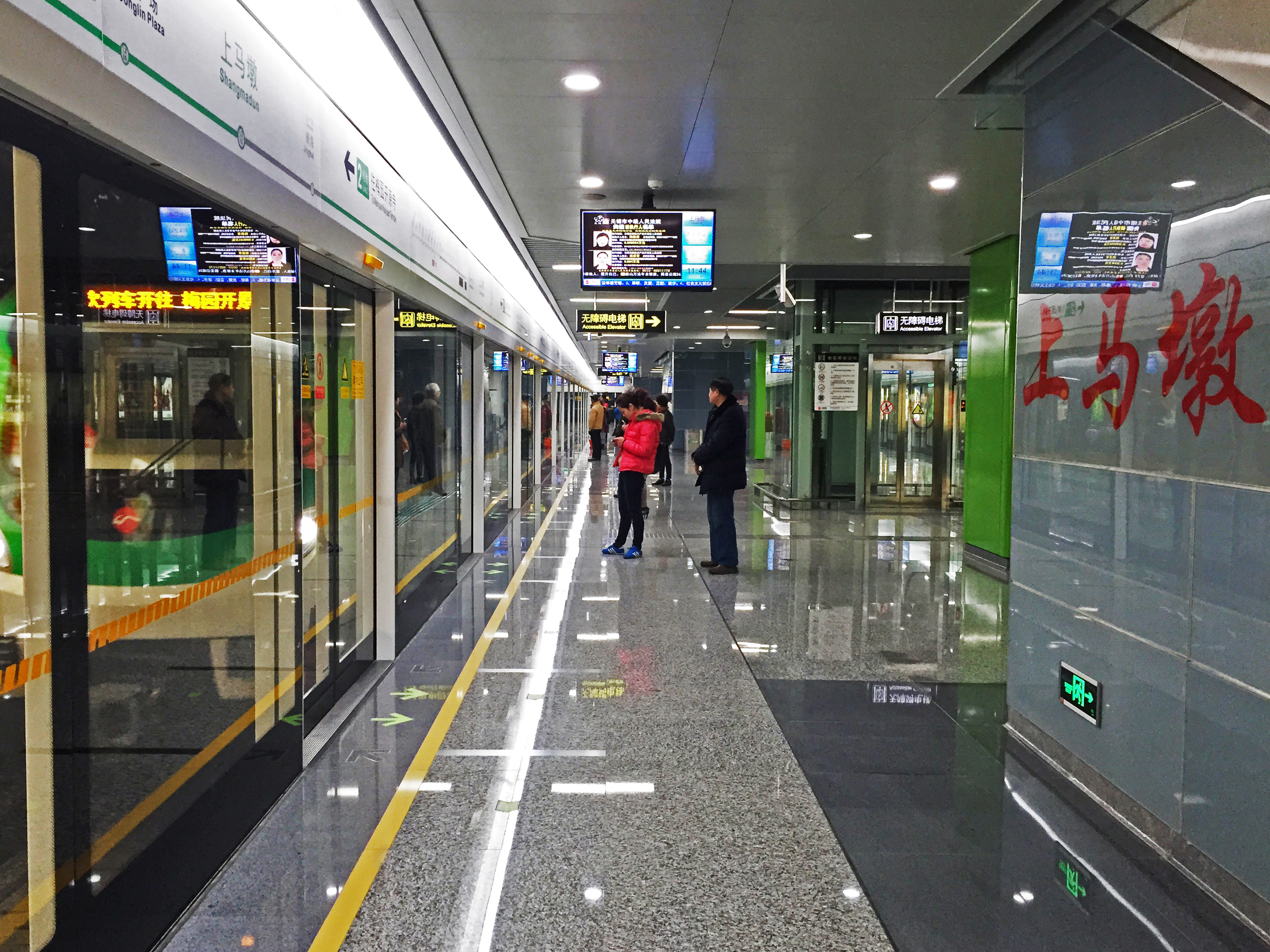
- Platform

General information
- Location: Chong'an District, Wuxi, Jiangsu; China
- Operator: Wuxi Metro Corporation
- Line: Line 2
- Platforms: 2 (1 island platform)

Construction
- Structure type: Underground

History
- Opened: 28 December 2014

Services
Preceding station	Wuxi Metro	Following station
Donglin Plaza towards Meiyuan Kaiyuan Temple	Line 2	Jinghai towards Wuxi East Railway Station
Location

Shangmadun Station (Chinese: 上马墩站) is a metro station of Line 2 of the Wuxi Metro. It started operations on 28 December 2014.

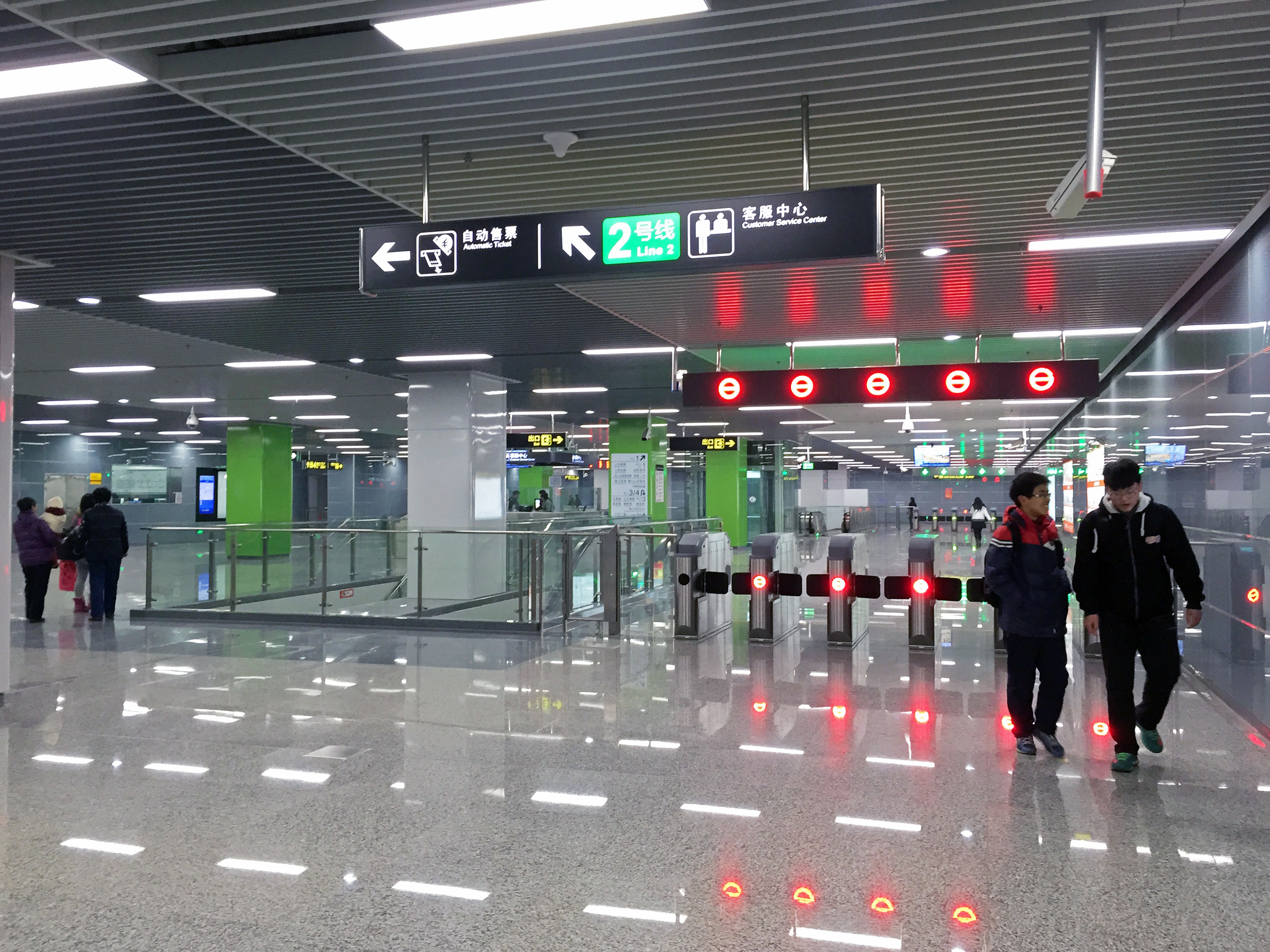
Station Hall

== Station layout ==
Ground
Ground	Exits

== Exits ==
There are 3 exits for this station.
