= Yingbin Square station =

Wuxi Metro station

Coordinates: 31.5936°N 120.4505°E

Yingbin Square 迎宾广场
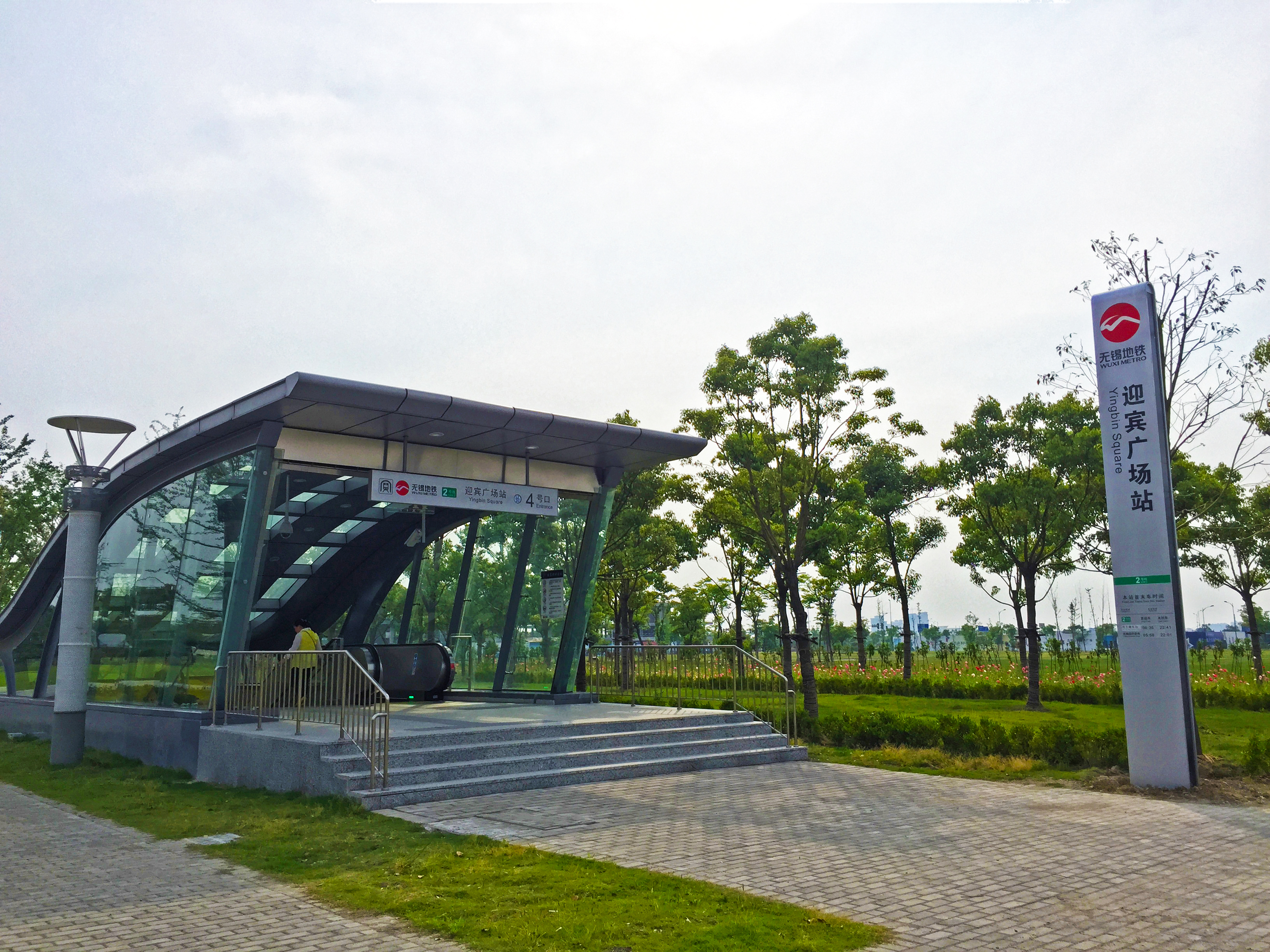
- Entrance 4

General information
- Location: Xishan District, Wuxi, Jiangsu; China
- Operator: Wuxi Metro Corporation
- Line: Line 2
- Platforms: 2 (1 island platform)

Construction
- Structure type: Underground

History
- Opened: 28 April 2015

Services
Preceding station	Wuxi Metro	Following station
Yingyuehu Park towards Meiyuan Kaiyuan Temple	Line 2	Wuxi East Railway Station Terminus
Location

Yingbin Square Station (Chinese: 迎宾广场站) is a metro station of Line 2 of the Wuxi Metro. It started operations on 28 April 2015.

== Station layout ==
Ground
Ground	Exits

B1	Station Hall	Service Center, Ticket vending machine, Toilet, Elevator, Shops
B2	West	←█ towards Meiyuan Kaiyuan Temple
B2	Island Platform, doors will open on the left
B2	East	█ towards Anzhen→

== Exits ==
There are 5 exits for this station.
