= Line 2 (Wuxi Metro) =

Metro line in Wuxi, China

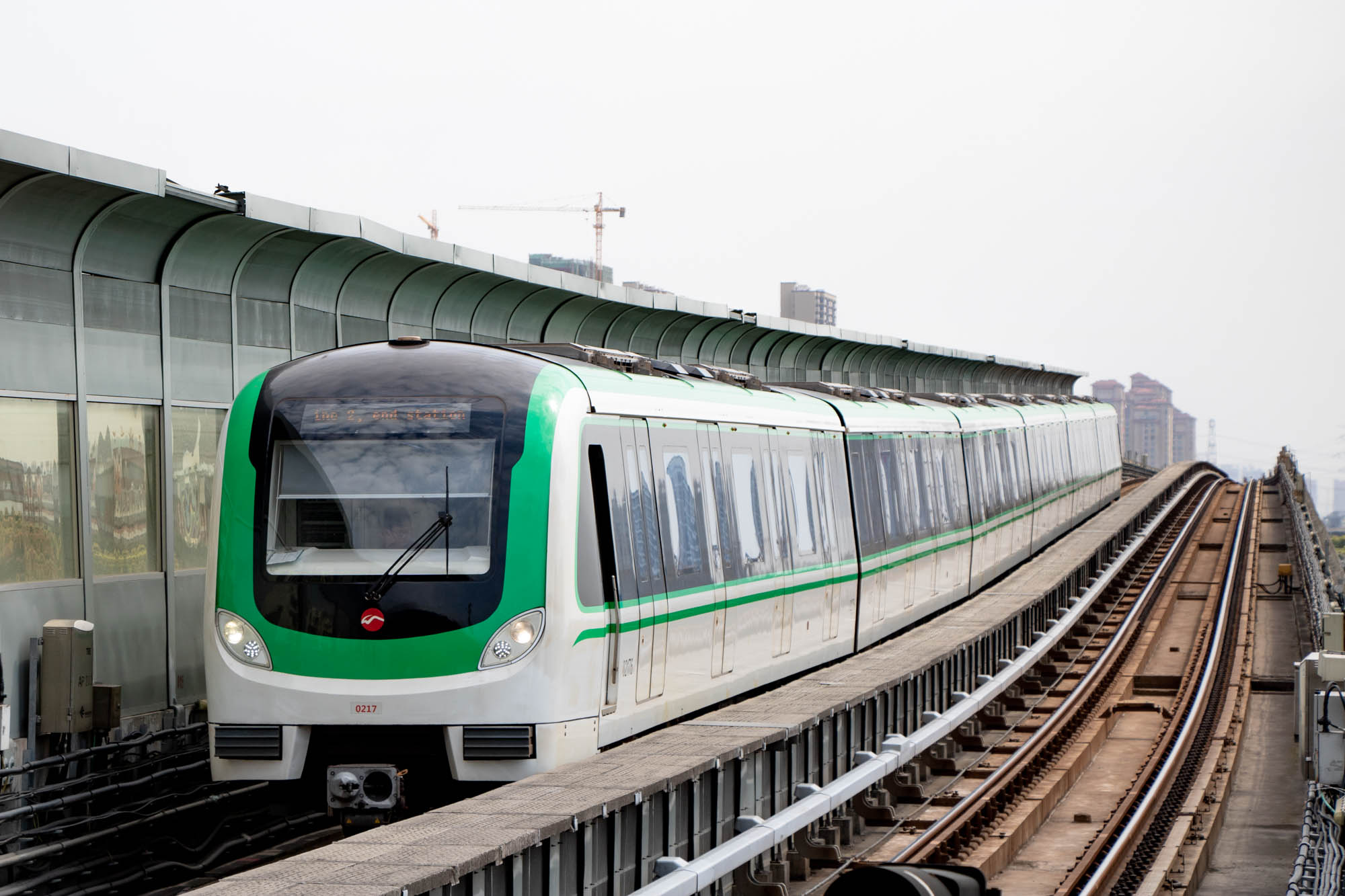
- A train of Wuxi Metro Line 2

Overview
- Status: Operational
- Owner: Wuxi Government
- Locale: Wuxi, Jiangsu, China
- Termini: Meiyuan Kaiyuan Temple; Anzhen
- Stations: 22 (22 in operation)

Service
- Type: Rapid transit
- System: Wuxi Metro
- Services: 1
- Operator(s): Wuxi Metro Corporation
- Rolling stock: 6-car Class B
- Daily ridership: 89,000 (May 2016 Avg.)

History
- Opened: 28 December 2014; 10 years ago

Technical
- Line length: 26.3 km (16.34 mi)
- Number of tracks: 2
- Character: Underground & Elevated
- Track gauge: 1,435 mm (4 ft 8 1/2 in)
- Electrification: 1,500 V DC third rail

Broadcasting for Wuxi Metro Line 2

Line 2 of the Wuxi Metro (Chinese: 无锡地铁2号线; pinyin: Wúxī Dìtiě Èr Hào Xiàn) is a rapid transit line linking east and west Wuxi. It opened on 28 December 2014. Two infill stations, Yingyuehu Park station and Yingbin Square station, opened on 28 April 2015. Anzhen station is not opened.

The line is 26.3 km long with 22 stations.

== Opening timeline ==
Segment	Commencement	Length	Station(s)	Name
Meiyuan Kaiyuan Temple — Wuxi East Railway Station	28 December 2014	26.3 km (16.34 mi)	19	Phase 1
Yingyuehu Park, Yingbin Square	28 April 2015	Infill stations	2	

== Stations (west to east) ==
Station No.	Station name		Connections	Distance km	Location
Station No.	English	Chinese	Connections	Distance km	Location
L201	Meiyuan Kaiyuan Temple	梅园开原寺			Binhu
L202	Rongxiang	荣巷			Binhu
L203	Xiaotaoyuan	小桃源			Binhu
L204	Heliekou	河埒口	4		Binhu
L205	Dawangji	大王基			Binhu
L206	Liangxidaqiao	梁溪大桥			Liangxi
L207	Wu'ai Plaza	五爱广场			Liangxi
L208	Sanyang Plaza	三阳广场	1		Liangxi
L209	Donglin Plaza	东林广场			Liangxi
L210	Shangmadun	上马墩			Liangxi
L211	Jinghai	靖海	3		Liangxi
L212	Guangyi	广益			Liangxi
L213	Baizhuang	柏庄			Xishan
L214	Dongting	东亭			Xishan
L215	Zhuangqiao	庄桥			Xishan
L216	Yunlin	云林			Xishan
L217	Jiulihe Park	九里河公园			Xishan/Xinwu
L218	Zhaqiao	查桥			Xishan
L219	Yingyuehu Park	映月湖公园			Xishan
L220	Yingbin Square	迎宾广场			Xishan
L221	Wuxi East Railway Station	无锡东站	WGH		Xishan
L222	Anzhen	安镇			Xishan

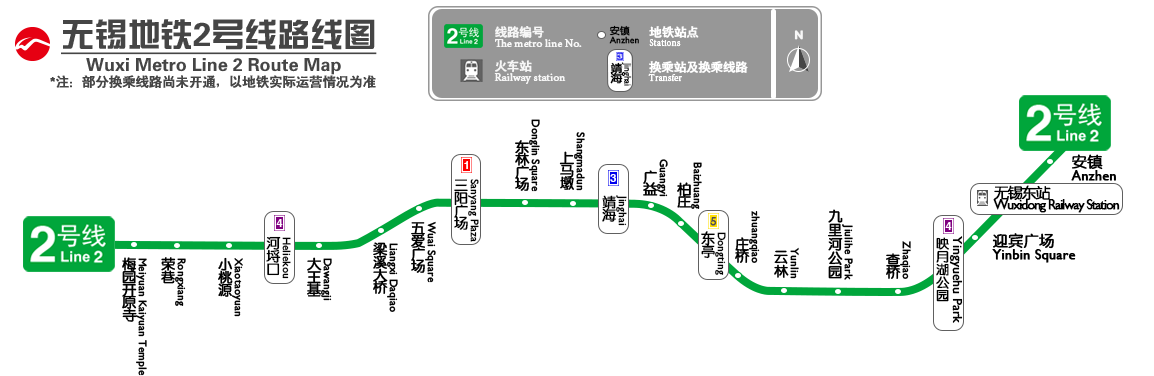
Map of Line 2
