= Binhu, Wuxi =

Binhu 滨湖区
- District
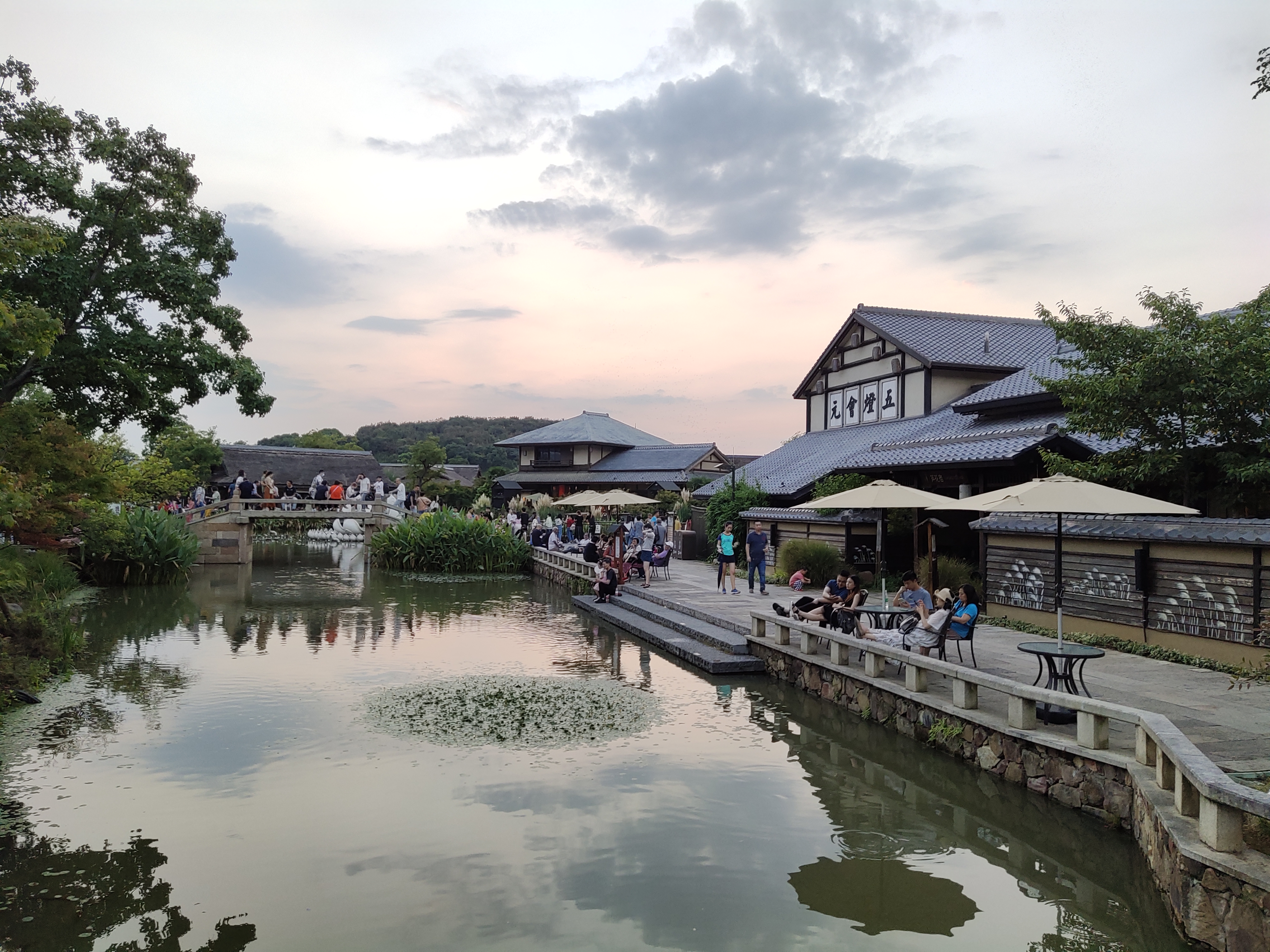
- Lingshan Town Nianhua Bay

- Location in Jiangsu
- Coordinates (Binhu District government): 31°31′40″N 120°17′03″E
- Country: People's Republic of China
- Province: Jiangsu
- Prefecture-level city: Wuxi

Area
  - Total: 608.58 km^{2} (234.97 sq mi)
  - Land: 572 km^{2} (221 sq mi)

Population
  - Total: 504,000
  - Density: 881/km^{2} (2,280/sq mi)
- Time zone: UTC+8 (China Standard)
- Postal code: 214100
- Website: http://www.jiangsu.gov.cn/col/col49048/index.html

Binhu District (simplified Chinese: 滨湖区; traditional Chinese: 濱湖區; pinyin: Bīnhú Qū) is one of six urban districts and the municipal seat of Wuxi, Jiangsu Province, People's Republic of China.

Located in the delta hinterland of the Yangtze River to the southwest of Wuxi City, the district has an area of 608.58 square kilometres (234.97 sq mi), of which 262.49 square kilometres (101.35 sq mi) is land, and a total population of 310,000.

Binhu district is the cradle of the ancient Wu culture and the birthplace of modern industrial and town-based enterprises.

== Administrative divisions ==
In the present, Binhu District has 9 subdistricts.

9 subdistricts

- Helie (河埒街道)
- Rongxiang (荣巷街道)
- Lihu (蠡湖街道)
- Liyuan (蠡园街道)
- Huazhuang (华庄街道)
- Taihu (太湖街道)
- Binhu (滨湖街道)
- Xuelang (雪浪街道)
- Mashan (马山街道)

== Education ==
Wuxi International School (WIS; 无锡国际学校) currently occupies a campus in Binhu District.
