= Meiyuan Kaiyuan Temple station =

Wuxi Metro station

Coordinates: 31°33′10″N 120°12′53″E

Meiyuan Kaiyuan Temple 梅园开原寺
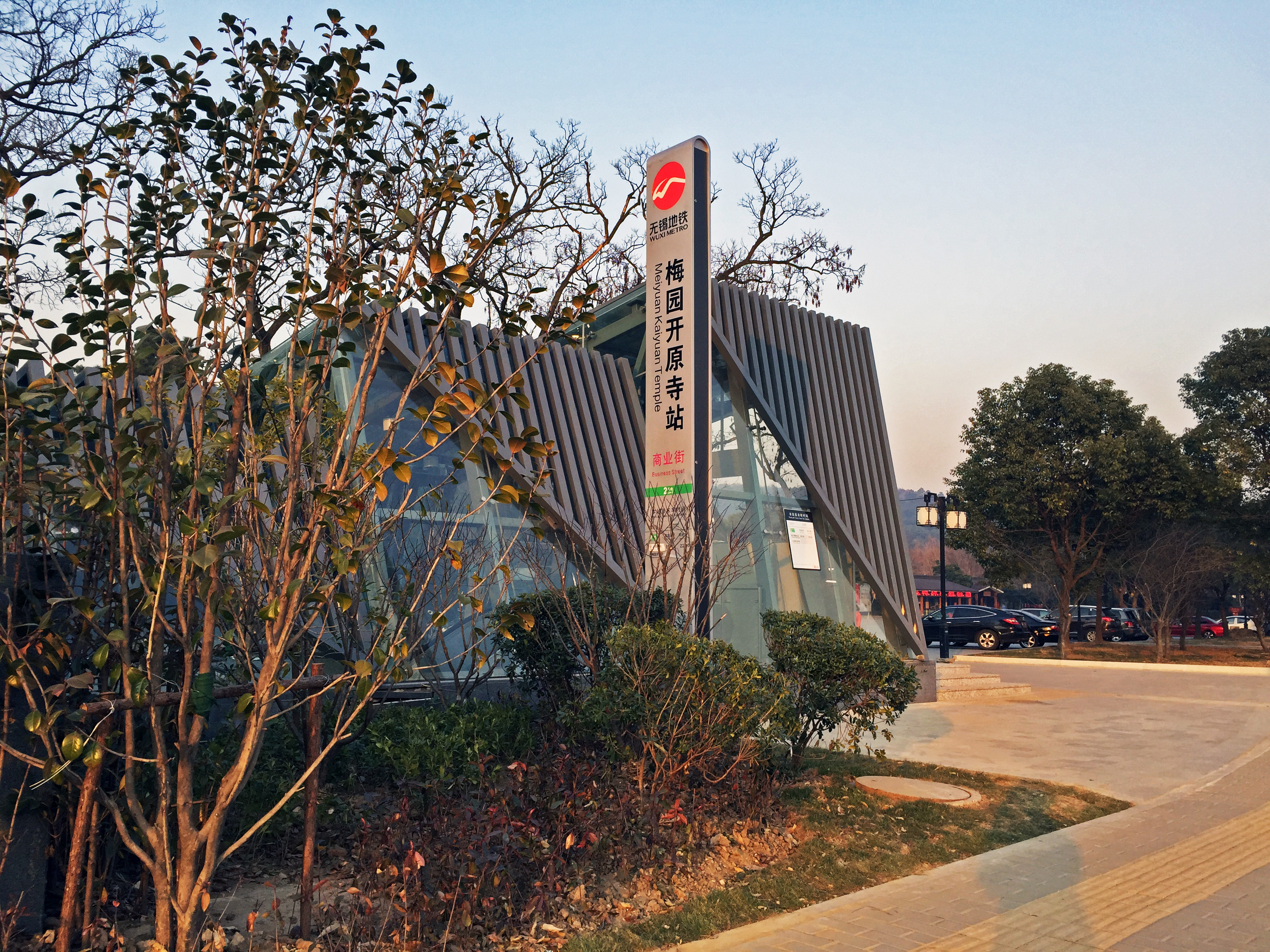
- Exit 5

General information
- Location: Binhu District, Wuxi, Jiangsu; China
- Operator: Wuxi Metro Corporation
- Line: Line 2
- Platforms: 2 (1 island platform)

Construction
- Structure type: Underground

History
- Opened: 28 December 2014

Services
Preceding station	Wuxi Metro	Following station
Terminus	Line 2	Rongxiang towards Wuxi East Railway Station
Location

Meiyuan Kaiyuan Temple Station (Chinese: 梅园开原寺站) is the western terminus of Line 2 of the Wuxi Metro. It started operations on 28 December 2014. The station is near The Plum Garden.

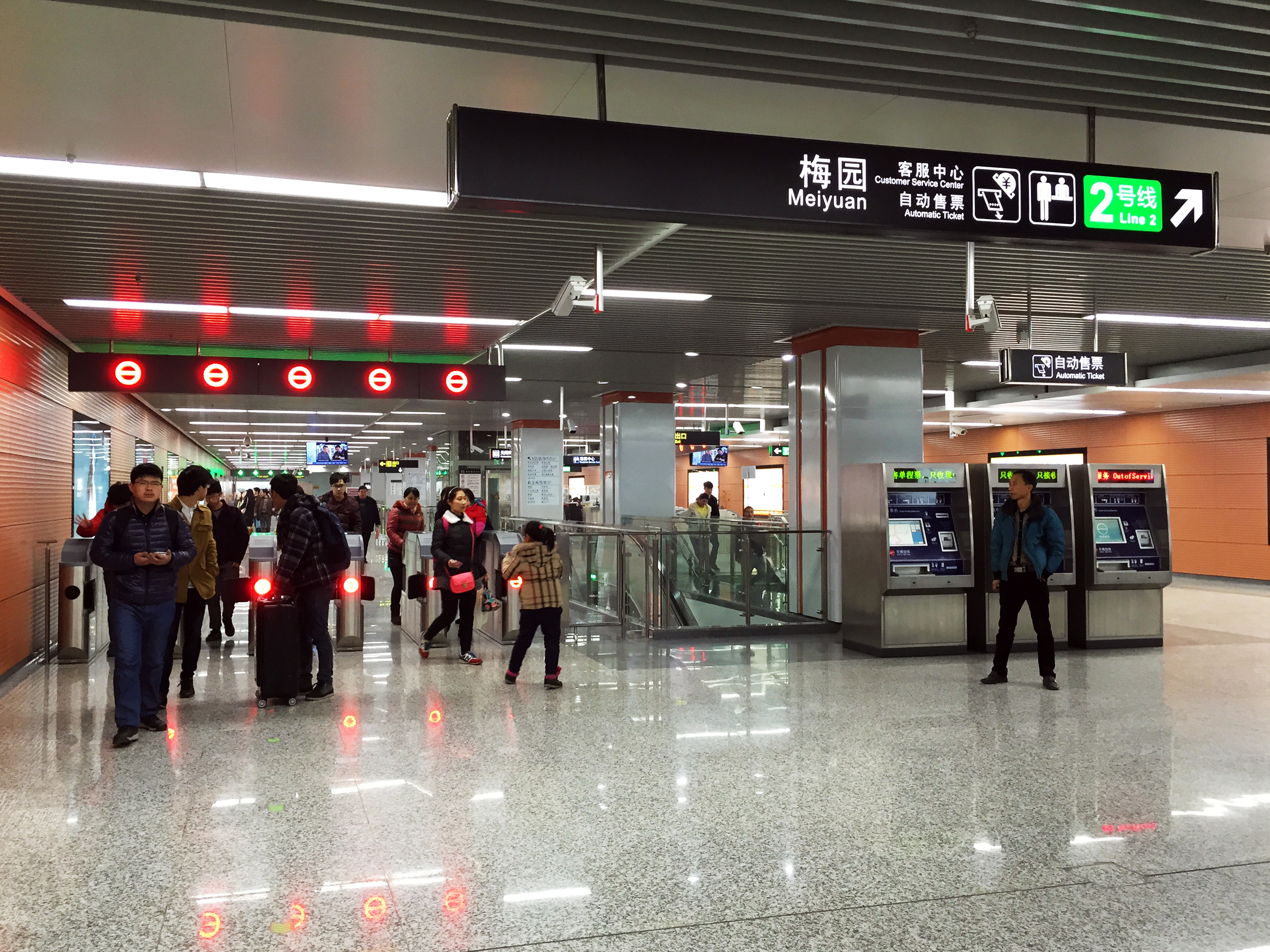
Station Hall

== Station layout ==
Ground
Ground	Exits

B1	Station Hall	Service Center, Ticket vending machine, Toilet, Elevator, Shops
B2	West	←█ Terminus
B2	Island Platform, doors will open on the left
B2	East	█ towards Anzhen→

== Exits ==
There are 9 exits for this station.
