= Wuxi East railway station =

High-speed railway station in Wuxi, China

Wuxidong 无锡东
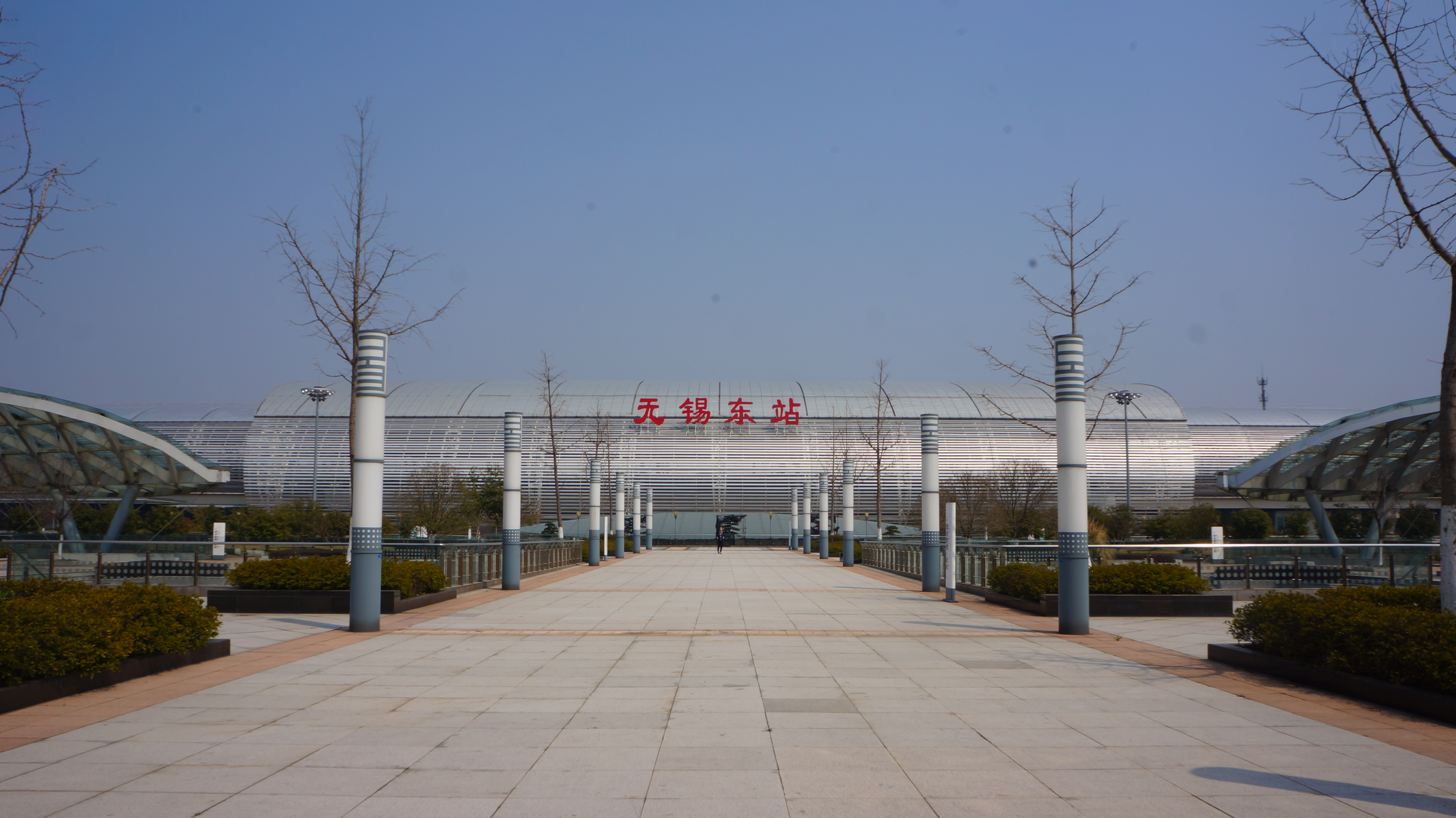
- Station building of Wuxidong Railway Station

General information
- Other names: Wuxi East
- Location: Xishan District, Wuxi, Jiangsu; China
- Coordinates: 31.600286°N 120.454144°E
- Operated by: Shanghai Railway Bureau; China Railway Corporation
- Line: Jinghu High-Speed Railway

Other information
- Station code: TMIS code: 66851; Telegraph code: WGH; Pinyin code: WXD
- Classification: 1st class station

History
- Opened: June 30, 2011
Location

The Wuxi East railway station (Chinese: 无锡东站) is a high-speed railway station in Wuxi, Jiangsu, People's Republic of China. It is served by the Jinghu High-Speed Railway. It was opened on June 30, 2011.

The station is located by the Xianfeng East Road, in Xishan, Wuxi. The station offers two ticket halls (north and south), four platforms, and daily services of trains to major cities in China.

== Metro Station ==
Wuxi East Railway Station 无锡东站
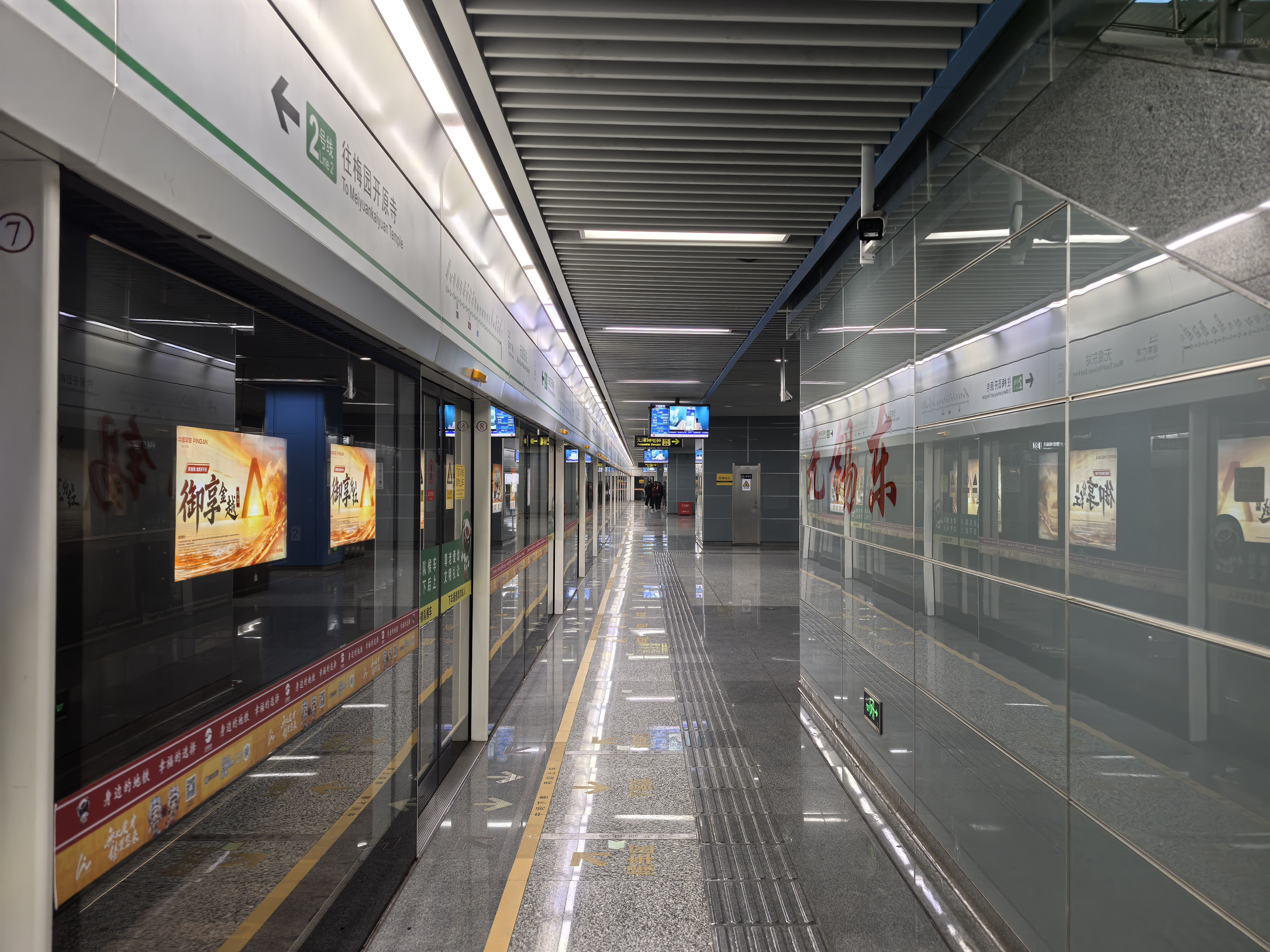
- Platform (towards Meiyuan Kaiyuan Temple)

General information
- Location: Xishan District, Wuxi, Jiangsu; China
- Operated by: Wuxi Metro Corporation
- Line: Line 2
- Platforms: 2 (1 island platform)

Construction
- Structure type: Underground

Other information
- Station code: L221

History
- Opened: 28 December 2014

Services
Preceding station	Wuxi Metro	Following station
Yingbin Square towards Meiyuan Kaiyuan Temple	Line 2	Terminus
Yingbin Square towards Meiyuan Kaiyuan Temple	Line 2	Anzhen Future station Terminus
Location

Wuxi East railway station is served by a station of the same name on Line 2 of Wuxi Metro. It started operations on 28 December 2014.

=== Station Layout ===
B1	Station Hall; Exits	Service Center, Ticket vending machine, Elevator, Toilet, Shops
B2	West	←█ towards Meiyuan Kaiyuan Temple
B2	Island Platform, doors will open on the left
B2	East	█ towards Anzhen (not open yet, this station is current terminus)→

=== Exits ===
There are four exits for this station.

== See also ==
- Wuxi railway station
- Wuxi Xinqu railway station

Preceding station	China Railway High-speed	Following station
Changzhou North towards Beijing South or Tianjin West	Beijing–Shanghai high-speed railway Part of the Shanghai–Wuhan–Chengdu passenger-dedicated railway	Suzhou North towards Shanghai Hongqiao
