= Wuxi Metro =

Metro system in Wuxi, China

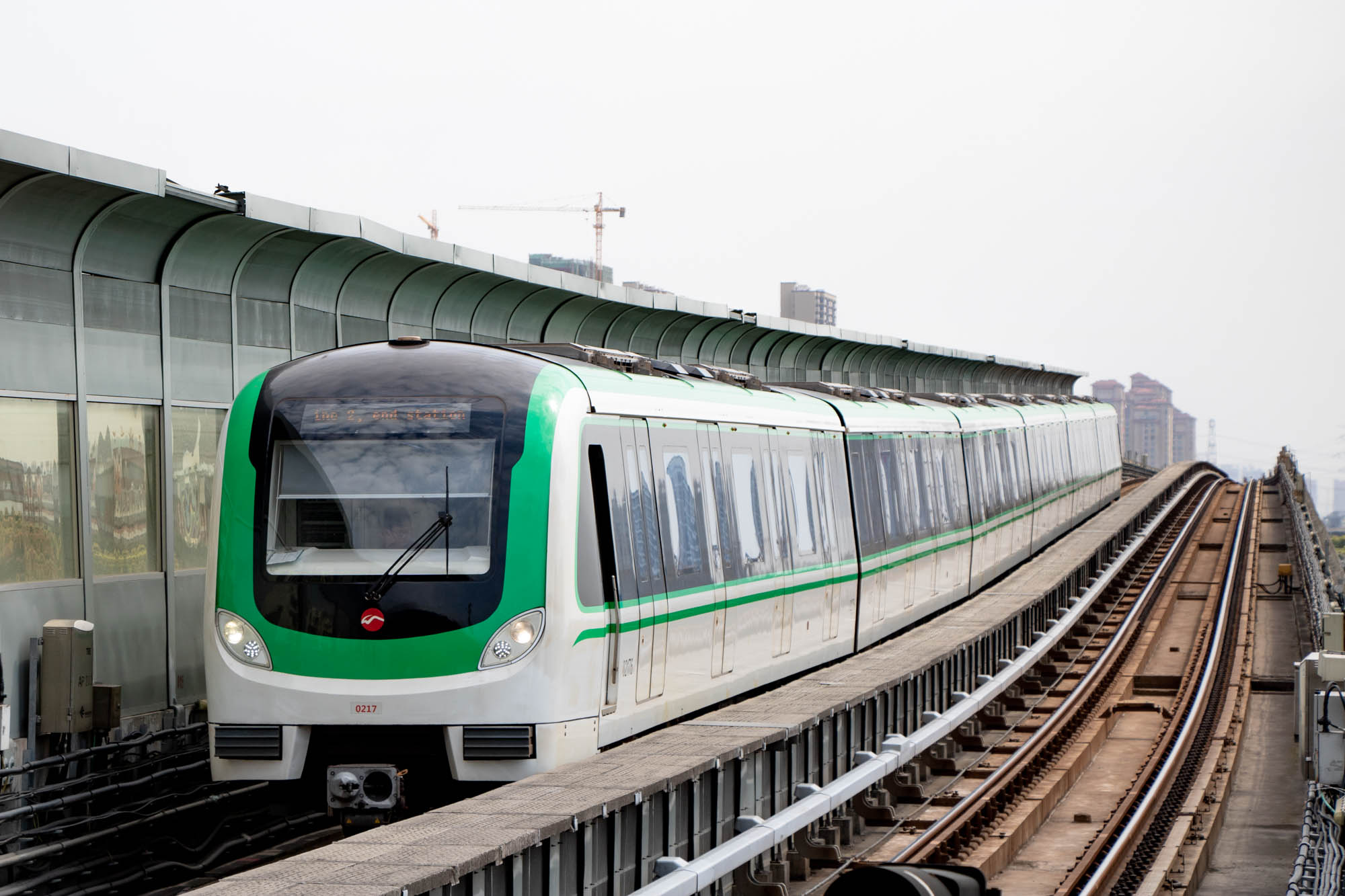

Overview
- Native name: 无锡地铁
- Locale: Wuxi, China
- Transit type: Rapid transit
- Number of lines: 5 (Note: A total of 11 routes are planned in the future)
- Number of stations: 97
- Daily ridership: 1,103,200 (31 December 2023), record paying
- Annual ridership: 184,600 million (2023)
- Website: wxmetro.net

Operation
- Began operation: July 1, 2014; 12 years ago
- Operator: Wuxi Metro Corporation
- Character: Mostly underground, with some elevated alignment
- Train length: 6–cars

Technical
- System length: 145 km (90 mi)
- Track gauge: 1,435 mm (4 ft 8 1/2 in) standard gauge
- Electrification: 1,500 V DC third rail
System map
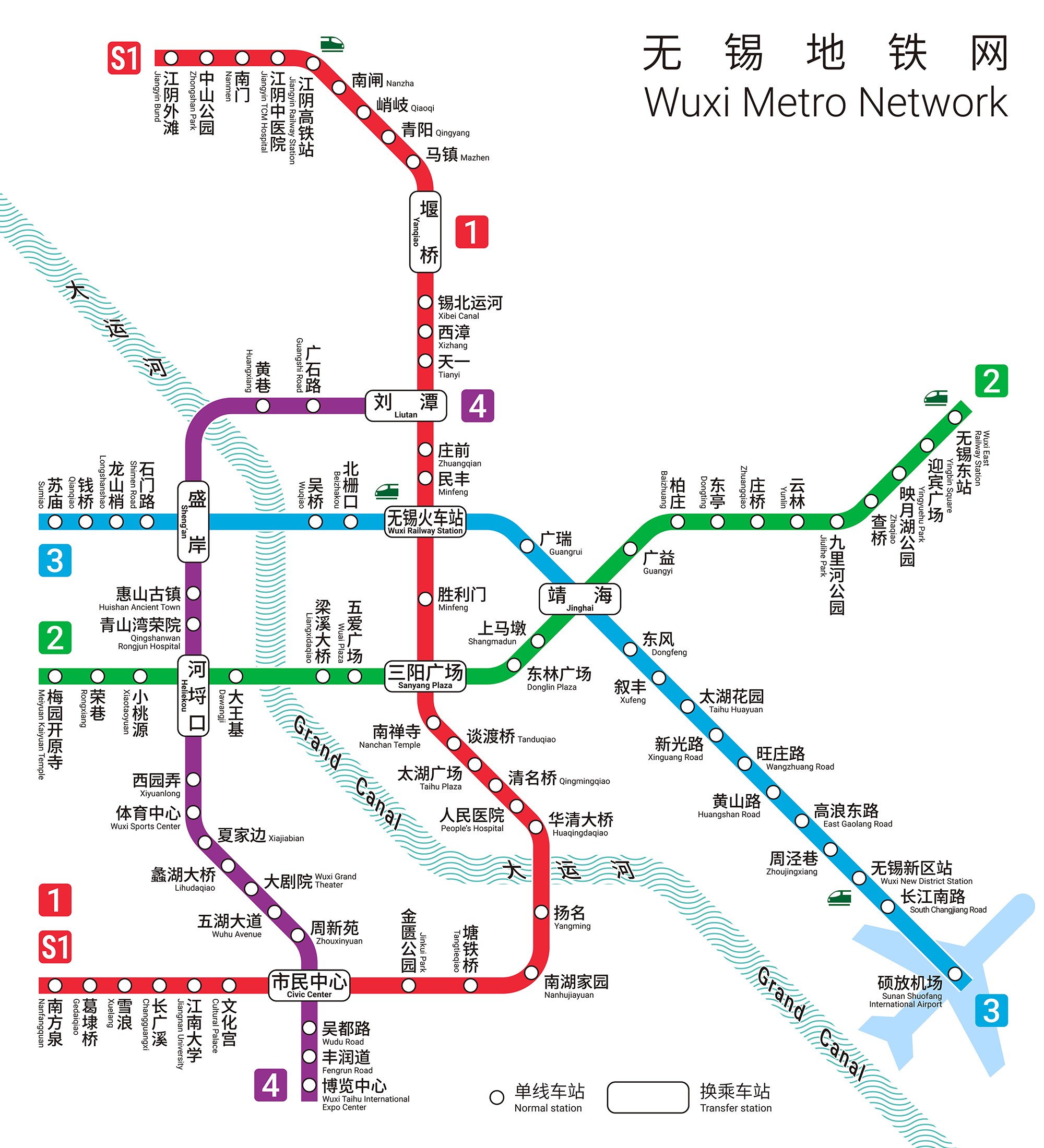

The Wuxi Metro (Chinese: 无锡地铁) is the public rapid transit system of the city Wuxi in Jiangsu, China. Line 1 began operations on 1 July 2014, and Line 2 on 28 December 2014. Line 3 opened on 28 October 2020. Line 4 opened on 17 December 2021. Line S1 opened on 31 January 2024. All metro lines covers Wuxi's five municipal districts, and the county-level city of Jiangyin, with an operating mileage of 145 kilometers and a total of 97 stations. Wuxi is the 22nd city in mainland China, and the third city in Jiangsu Province, to open rail transit.

As of December 2023, there are 4 lines under construction in Wuxi Metro, namely Line 4 Phase 2, Line 5 Phase 1, Line 6 Phase 1, and Line S2.

In 2016, the annual passenger volume of Wuxi Metro was 81.468 million, with an average daily passenger volume of more than 223,200. In 2015, its annual passenger volume was 71 million, with an average daily passenger volume of more than 195,000. In the second half of 2014, its annual passenger volume was 17.7025 million, with an average daily passenger volume of more than 97,000. On 10 February 2024, the average daily passenger flow of Wuxi subway lines reached 1,233,400 passengers (but free), exceeding the previous record of 1,103,200 passengers (paying) on 31 December 2023. On 16 February 2024, the Wuxi subway network carried 1.4112 million passengers, a record high.

== Lines in operation ==
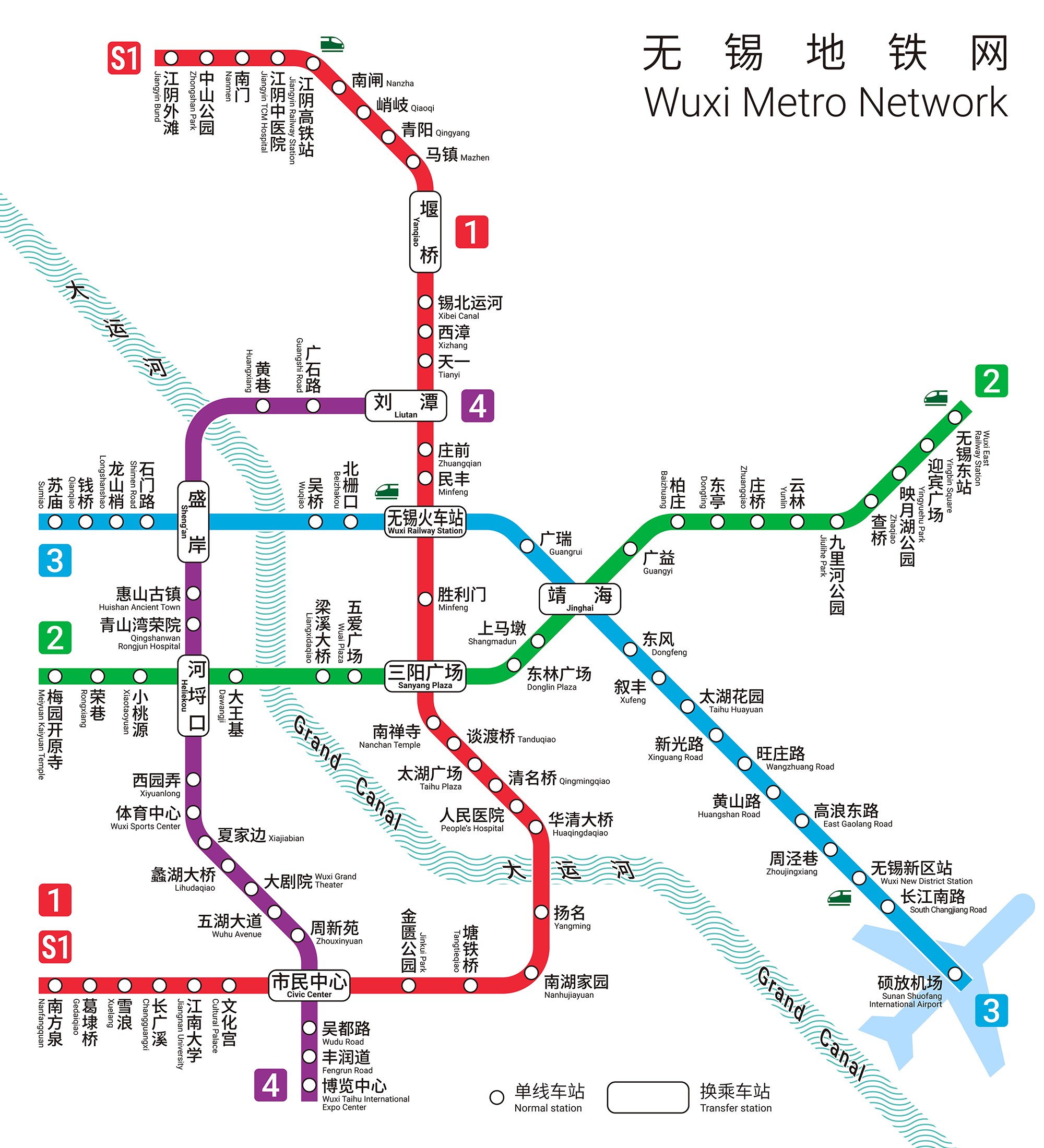
Map of Wuxi Metro

Line	Termini (District)		Commencement	Newest Extension	Length km	Stations
1	Yanqiao (Huishan)	Nanfangquan (Binhu)	2014	2019	34.6	27
2	Meiyuan Kaiyuan Temple (Binhu)	Wuxi East Railway Station (Xishan)	2014	—	26.3	21 (Note: Anzhen station is not opened.)
3	Sumiao (Binhu)	Sunan Shuofang International Airport (Xinwu)	2020	—	28.5	21
4	Liutan (Huishan)	Wuxi Taihu International Expo Center (Binhu)	2021	—	25.4	18
S1	Yanqiao (Huishan)	Jiangyin Bund (Jiangyin)	2024	—	30.4 km	10
Total					145	97

Map of Wuxi Metro with lines under construction.

=== Line 1 ===
Line 1 runs north to south for 34.6 kilometers (21.5 mi) serving 27 stations. Most of the route is underground, with only 5 stations and 7 kilometers (4.3 mi) running on an elevated alignment. CSR Zhuzhou supplied 23 six-car trainsets for the line.

=== Line 2 ===
Line 2 runs east to west for 26.3 kilometers (16.3 mi) with 21 stations (originally 22 stations, but Anzhen station is not opened), with 6.7 kilometers (4.2 mi) being elevated and the remainder underground. CSR Puzhen supplied a fleet of 120m-long six-car Type B metro trains for the line.

=== Line 3 ===
Line 3 runs east to west for 28.5 kilometers (17.7 mi) with 21 stations. The entire line is underground.

=== Line 4 ===
Line 4 is 25.4 kilometers in length with 18 stations. The entire line is underground.

=== Line S1 ===
Line S1 of Wuxi Metro, also known as Wuxi–Jiangyin intercity railway (无锡至江阴城际轨道交通) or Xicheng line (锡澄线) started construction on October 17, 2019, and was opened on 31 January 2024. It is 30.4 km in length with 9 new stations, including 5 underground stations and 4 elevated stations. The line runs from Yanqiao station on Line 1 to Jiangyin Waitan station in Jiangyin (a county-level city administered by Wuxi). Line S1 through-operates with Line 1. The line has distinct express and local services.

== Under construction ==
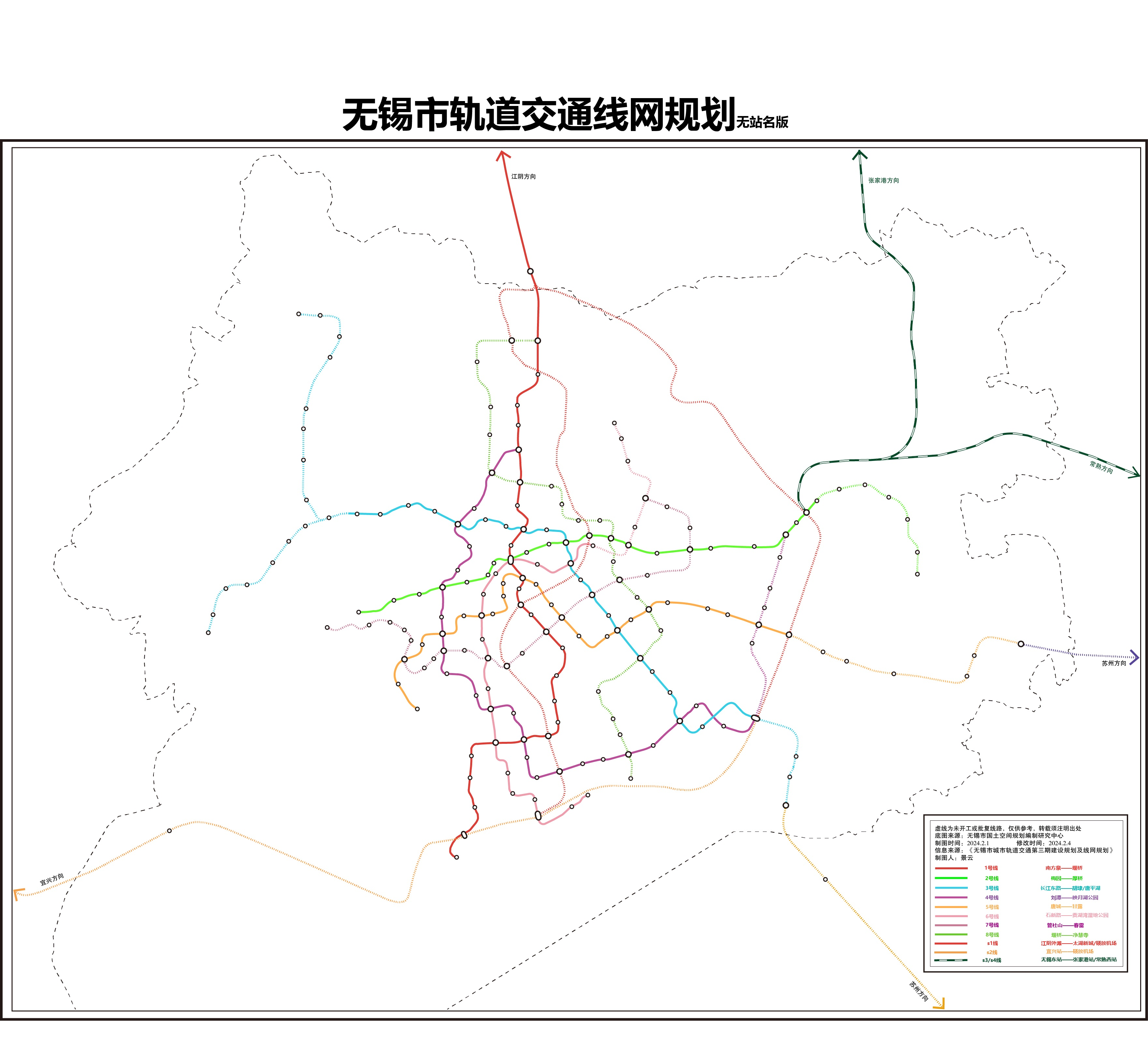
Wuxi Metro Urban Area Planning

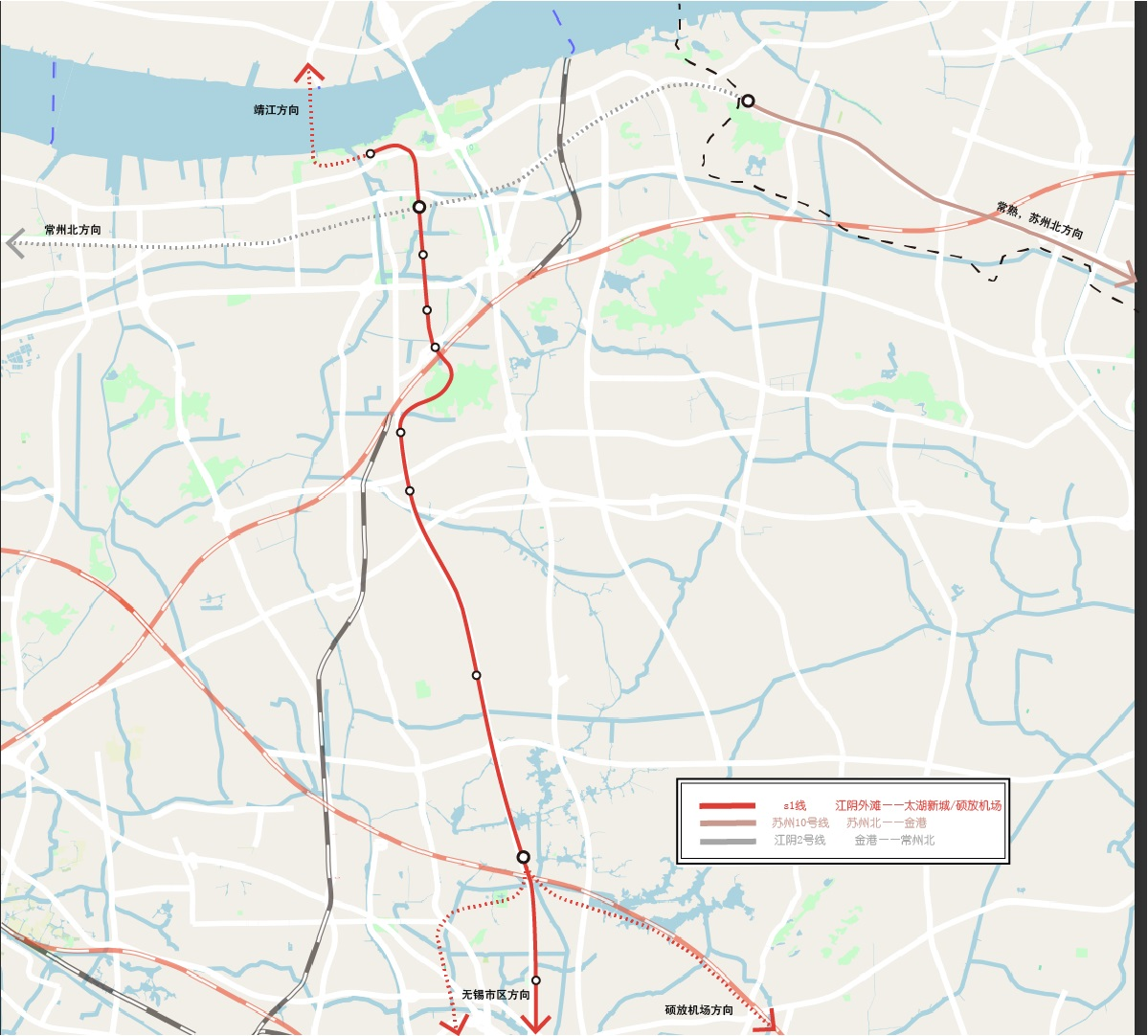
S1

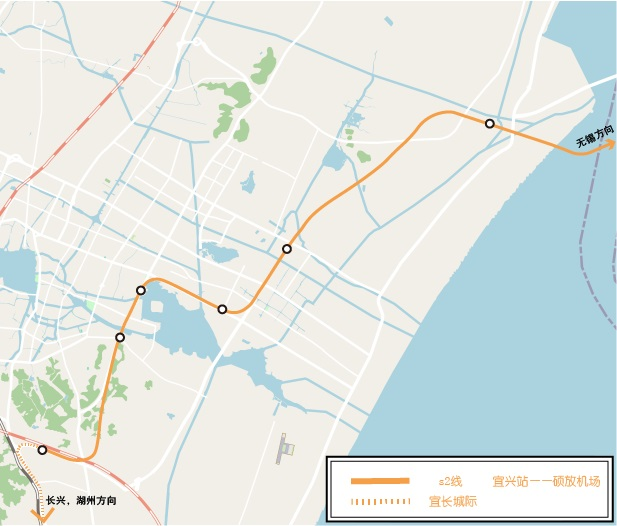
S2

=== Line S2 ===
Line S2 of Wuxi Metro, also known as Wuxi–Yixing intercity railway (无锡至宜兴城际轨道交通) or Xiyi line (锡宜线) is under construction. Yixing is a county-level city administered by Wuxi. It will be 59.56 km in length from Yixing railway station to Taihu Xincheng station. Construction of the first phase (Yixing railway station to Zhoutie, about 26 km) started in January 2023.

Route	Name	Termini		Planned Opening	Length	Stations	Status	Ref.
S2	Wuxi–Yixing intercity railway or Xiyi line	Zhoutie	Yixing Railway Station	2030	59.56 km	9	Under construction	

=== Phase 3 construction plan (2021-2026) ===
The Phase 3 construction plan (2021-2026) of Wuxi Metro will add 59.8 km of new lines and extensions.

Route	Name	Termini		Planned Opening	Length	Stations	Status	References
4	2nd Phase	Wuxi Taihu International Expo Center	Xishi Road	2026	12.4 km	8	Final Testings	
5	1st Phase	Tangcheng	Xinyun Road	2028	28.9 km	22	Under Construction	
6	1st Phase	Gonghu Wetland Park	Guangyuan Road	2029	22.3 km	16	Under Construction	

== Long-term plans ==
According to the long-term planning of Wuxi Metro, it will form a network of 8 lines and 1 branch line, S1. S2 and the network would be 350 km (220 mi) long in long-term planning.

Lines 1, 2 and 3 would be the main lines, radiating from the city center, while Lines 4,5,6,7,8would be the tangential lines for suburb to suburb traffic. Environmentally friendly and energy efficient designs will be integrated into construction and design of the stations.

Route	Name	Termini		Planned Opening	Length	Stations	Status	References
2		Wuxi East Railway Station	Anzhen					
3	North extension	Sumiao	Tangpinghu		13.52	8		
3	South extension	Sunan Shuofang International Airport (Xinwu)	Changjiangdonglu					
3	Branch line	Sumiao	Hudai					
4	3rd Phase	Xishi Road	Yingyuehu Park					
5	2nd Phase							
6	2nd Phase	Guangyuan Road	Shixin Road		6.2	4		
7	Planning	North Yunlin	Guansheshan					
8	Planning	Jinghui Temple	Yanqiao					

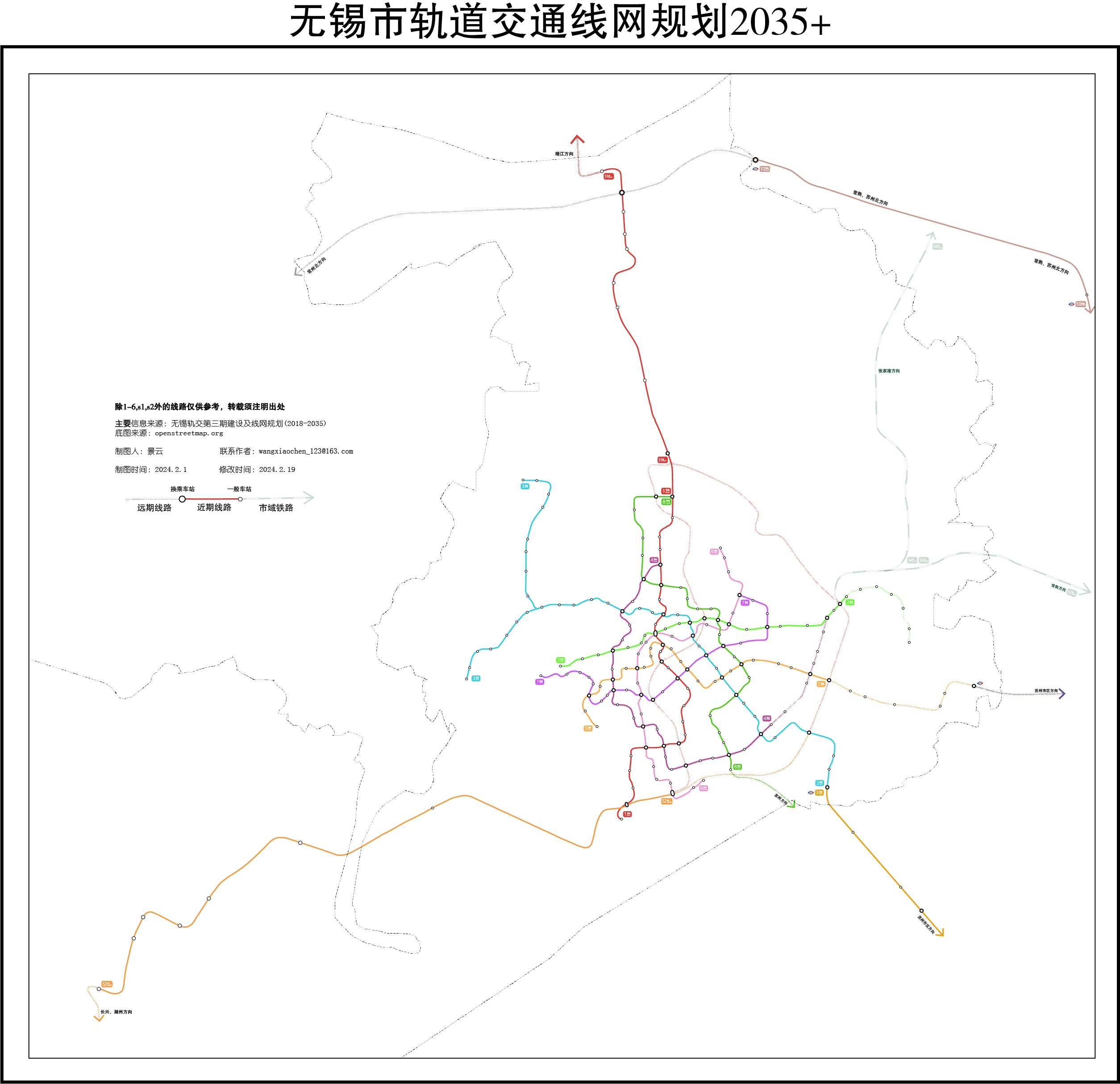
Wuxi Metro Overall Planning
