= Henglin railway station =

Railway station in Jiangsu, China

Henglin railway station 横林站
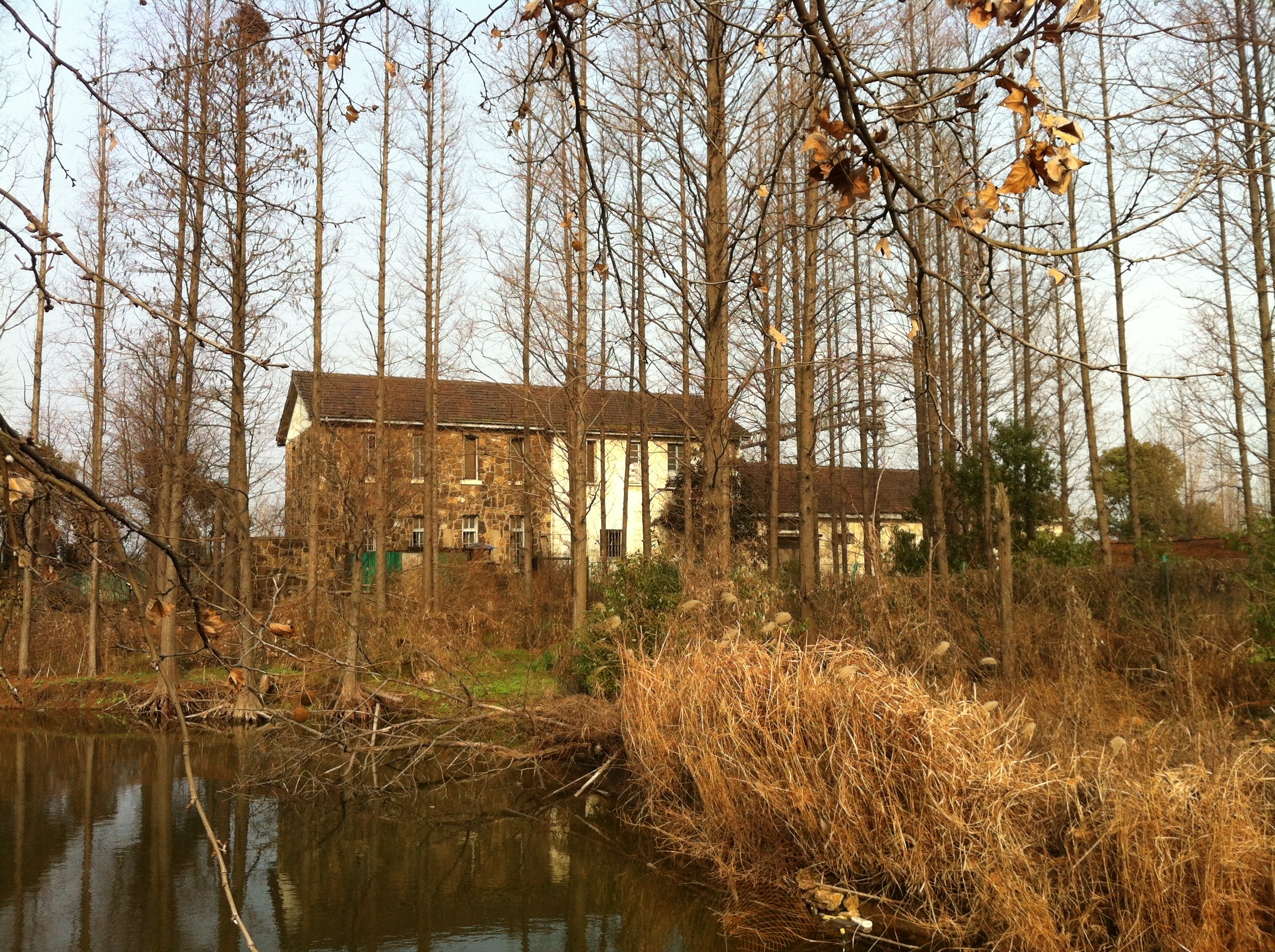

General information
- Location: China
- System: Railway station
- Line: Shanghai–Nanjing Intercity Railway

History
- Opened: 1906
- Closed: 2009

Henglin railway station is a reserved railway station of Shanghai–Nanjing intercity railway located in Jiangsu, People's Republic of China.

It was a station of Beijing–Shanghai railway that was opened in 1906, and closed in 2009.

Preceding station	China Railway High-speed	Following station
Huishan towards Shanghai or Shanghai Hongqiao	Shanghai–Nanjing intercity railway Part of the Shanghai–Wuhan–Chengdu passenger-dedicated line	Qishuyan towards Nanjing
