= Wuxi railway station =

Railway station in Wuxi, China

Wuxi 无锡
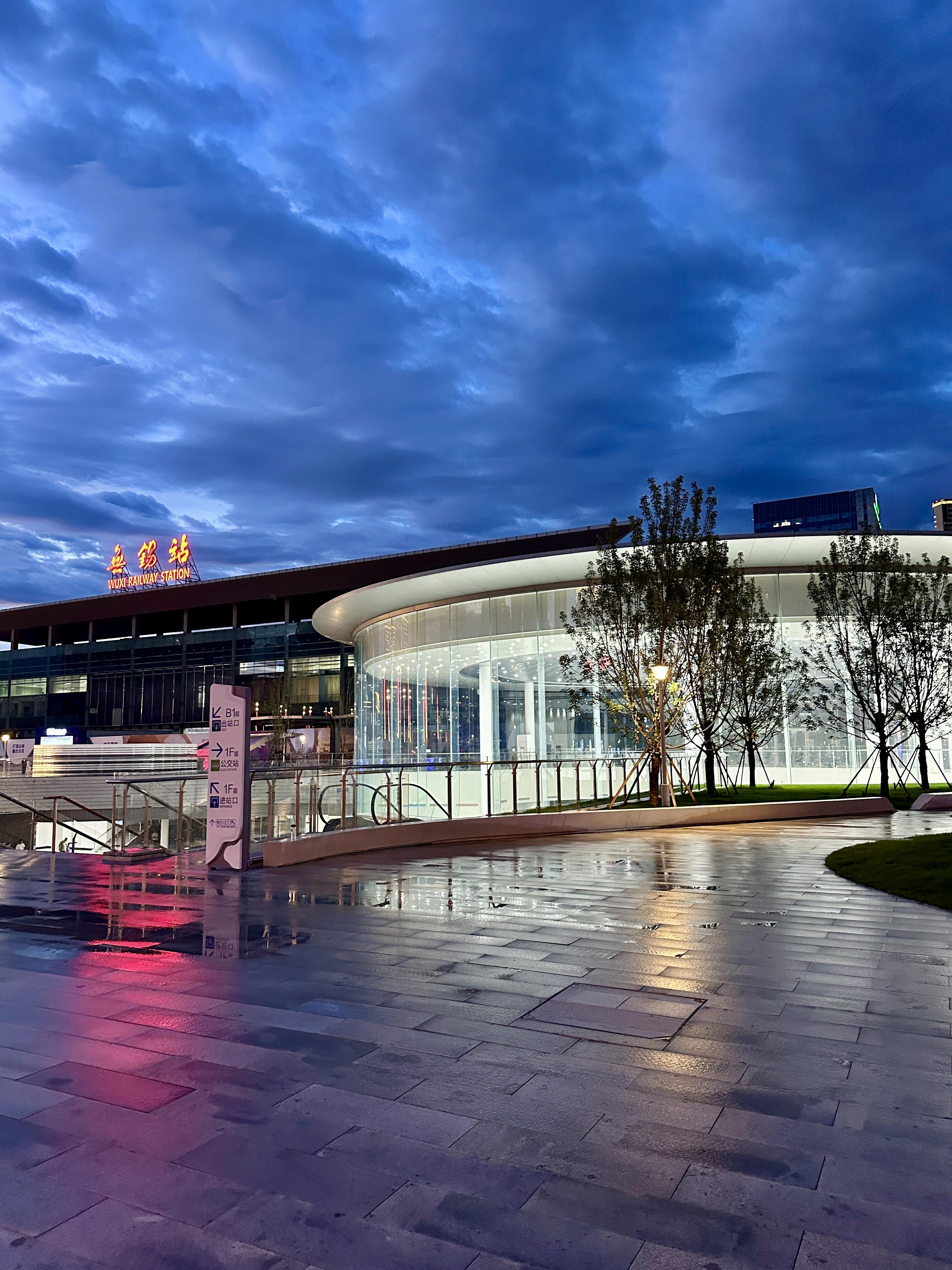
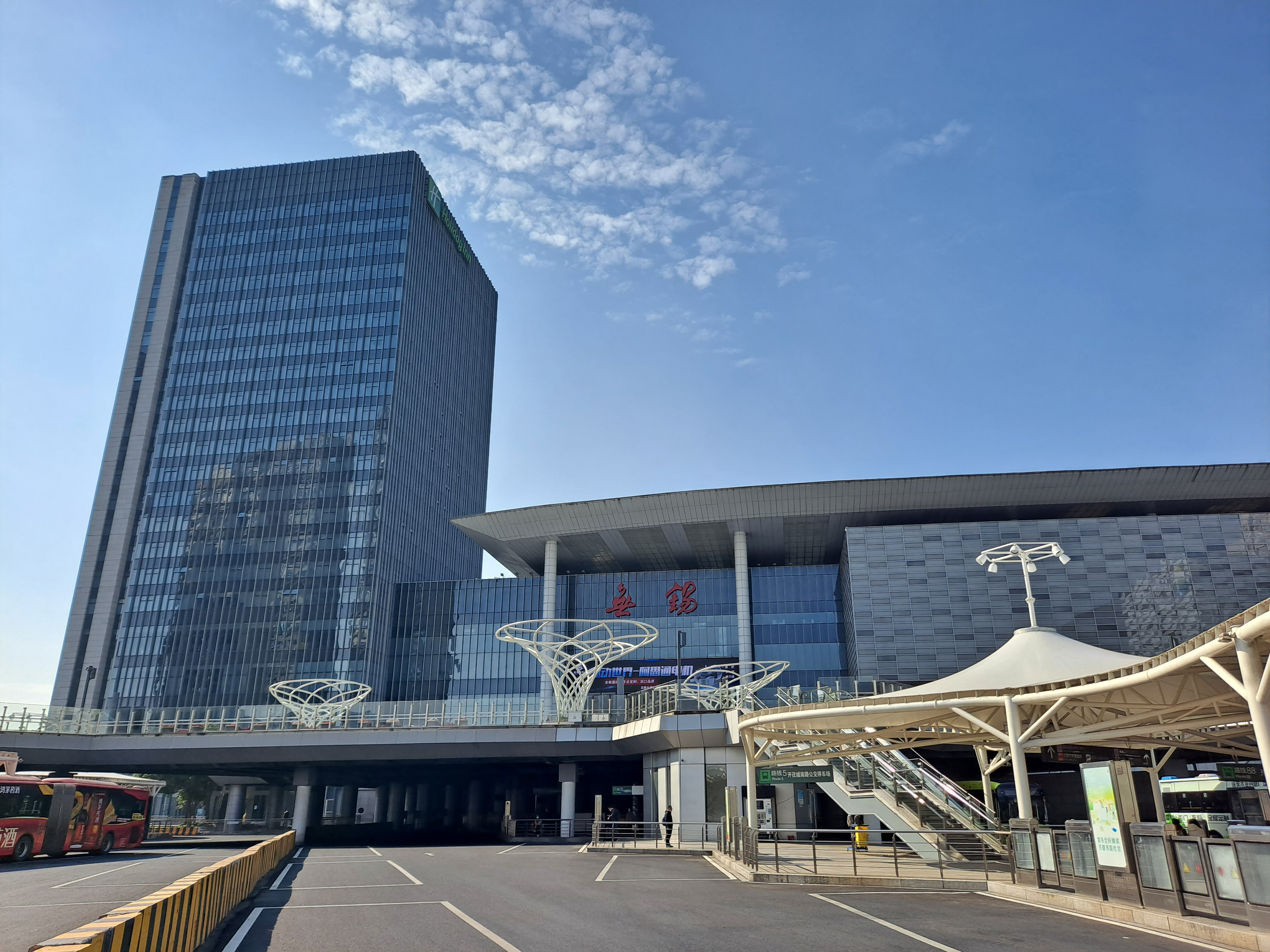
- South Station Building North station building

General information
- Location: Chong'an District, Wuxi, Jiangsu; China
- Coordinates: 31°35′21″N 120°18′3″E
- Operator: Shanghai Railway Bureau, China Railway Corporation
- Lines: Jinghu railway, Shanghai-Nanjing Intercity Railway
- Platforms: 7

Other information
- Station code: TMIS code: 30497; Telegraph code: WXH; Pinyin code: WXI
- Classification: Top Class station

History
- Opened: 1906
Location

Wuxi railway station (simplified Chinese: 无锡站; traditional Chinese: 無錫站; pinyin: Wúxī zhàn) is a railway station of Jinghu railway and Shanghai-Nanjing Intercity Railway, located in Chong'an District, Wuxi, Jiangsu, is a special station under the jurisdiction of China Railway Shanghai Bureau Group Co., Ltd. The main lines are the Beijing-Shanghai Railway and the Shanghai-Nanjing Intercity Railway.

Wuxi Station was first built in 1905 and was originally a first-class station; in 1973, Wuxi Station began to expand; in 1976, Wuxi Station was built as a double-track station; in 1999, Wuxi Station became a special-class station; on December 10, 2018, Wuxi Station The reconstruction project of the South Square has been completed and put into use.

As of December 2018, the platform size of Wuxi Railway Station is 7 platforms and 12 lines.

== History ==
=== First Generation ===
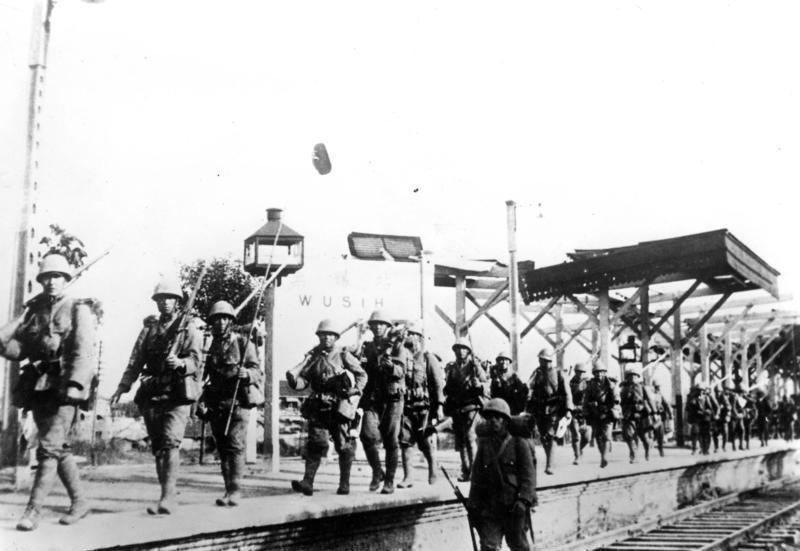
Japanese occupation army on the platform of Wuxi/Wusih Station, December 1937

Wuxi Railways Station was opened its operation after the completion of Wuxi–Nanxiang section of Shanghai–Nanjing railway. The station was the second-class station, with a station building of 275 m^{2} (2,960 sq ft) and 2 platforms. There were 2 trains daily. In 1907, Wuxi–Changzhou section began operation. There was a proposal to construct a railway to Huzhou, Zhejiang via Yixing, Liyang, Guangde at the time, but the proposal was refused by the Beiyang government.

Wuxi Railway Station was in the middle of the Shanghai-Nanjing Railway. Since its importance in transportation, it was upgraded to the first-class station in 1929. During spring of 1935, the railway operator opened a special "plum blossom-sightseeing" train to Shanghai. Until 1937, Wuxi station was the biggest station on Shanghai-Nanjing Railway in Wuxi, and the fasted train to Shanghai takes 2 hours and 22 minutes. A new track was constructed in 1942 under the Japanese-controlled Central China Railway.

=== Second Generation ===
The station was severely devastated during the Second Sino-Japanese War. The Nationalist government took over the station in November 1945 after the surrender of Japan. At the time the station has 40 trains per day, and the daily ridership exceeds 20,000, which was 2 times before the war. Starting August 1948, the renovation project of the Wuxi Station started, the new station building was designed by a foreign architect, with a length of 51.35 meters (168 ft 6 in), depth of 19.80 meters (65 ft 0 in) and the total size of 1,016.73 square meters (10,944.0 sq ft). The new station building was completed in April 1949, meanwhile, the existing 2 platform was extended to 268.2 meters (879 ft 11 in) in length and canopies over the platform were constructed.

The PLA occupied Wuxi on April 23, 1949, and the rail service was suspended until May 27. Between March and December 1957, the railway operator constructed new tracks and canopies at the station's freight yard; and it also renovated the station yard and station square in 1956. In 1958, 2 new track was constructed due to the growth in industry in Wuxi.

The station renovated the station building in April 1962. During this renovation, a restaurant located on the mezzanine of the station was destructed; the roof of the station building was maintained and a new exit was added. A new waiting room of 1,840 square meters (19,800 sq ft) located west of the existing station building was started its construction in June 1969. In 1971, the tracks to South Gate Freight Yard was duplicated, existing canopies on the platforms were renovated, and there is an underground of 25 meters (82 ft 0 in) in length, 4 meters (13 ft 1 in) in width and 2.6 meters (8 ft 6 in) in heights was constructed also.

=== Third Generation ===
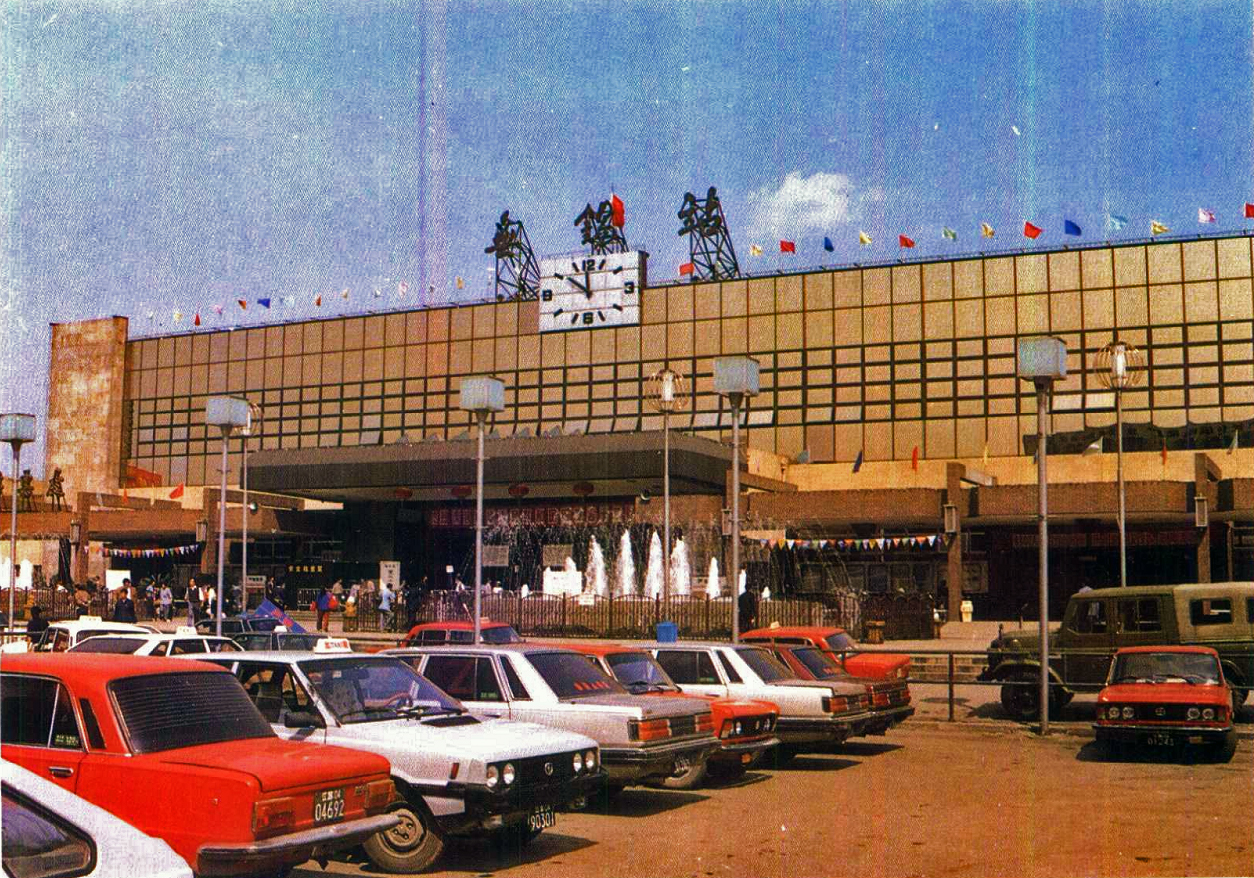
The station building after 1988 renovation

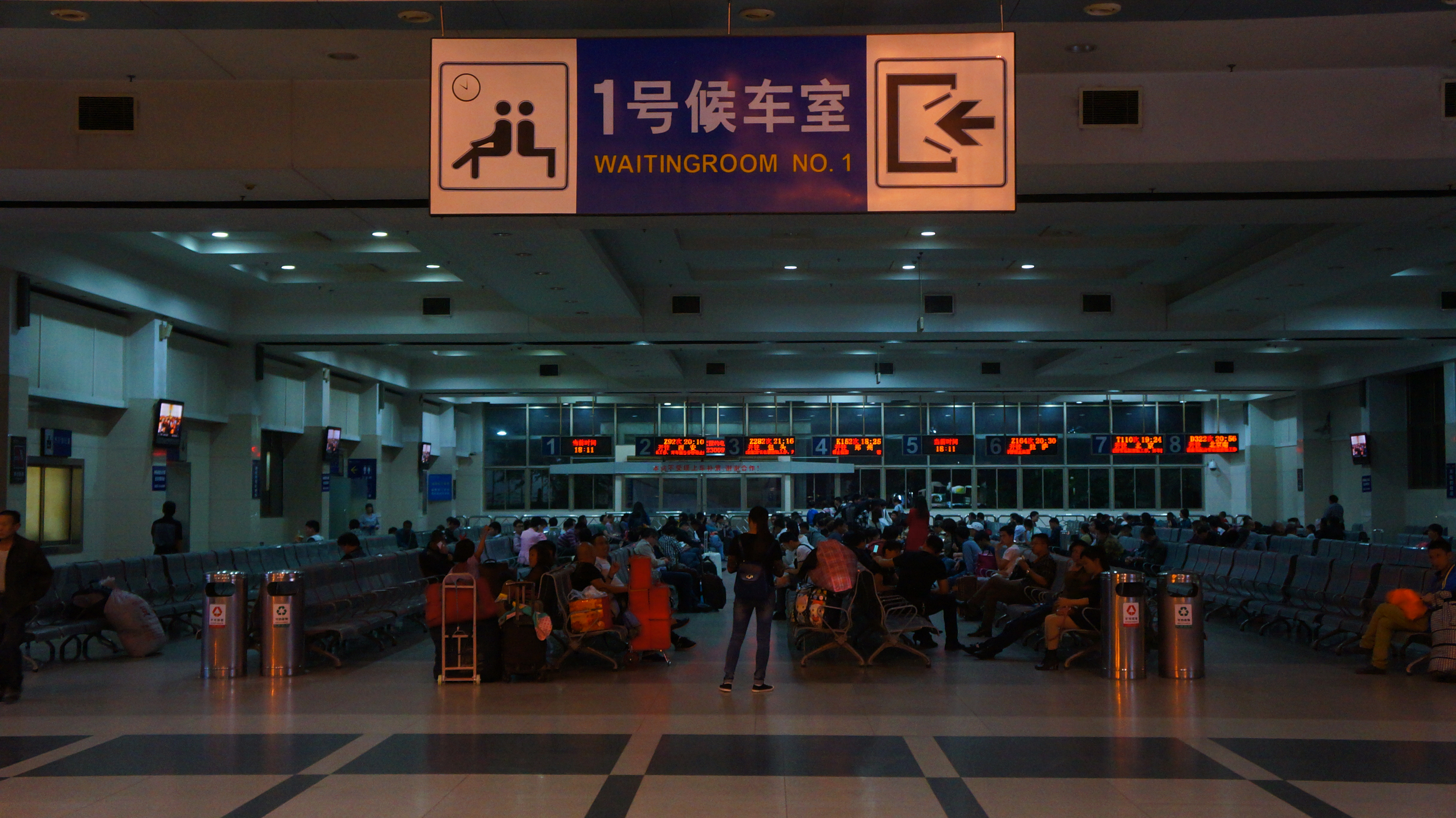
The waiting room 1 of the station building

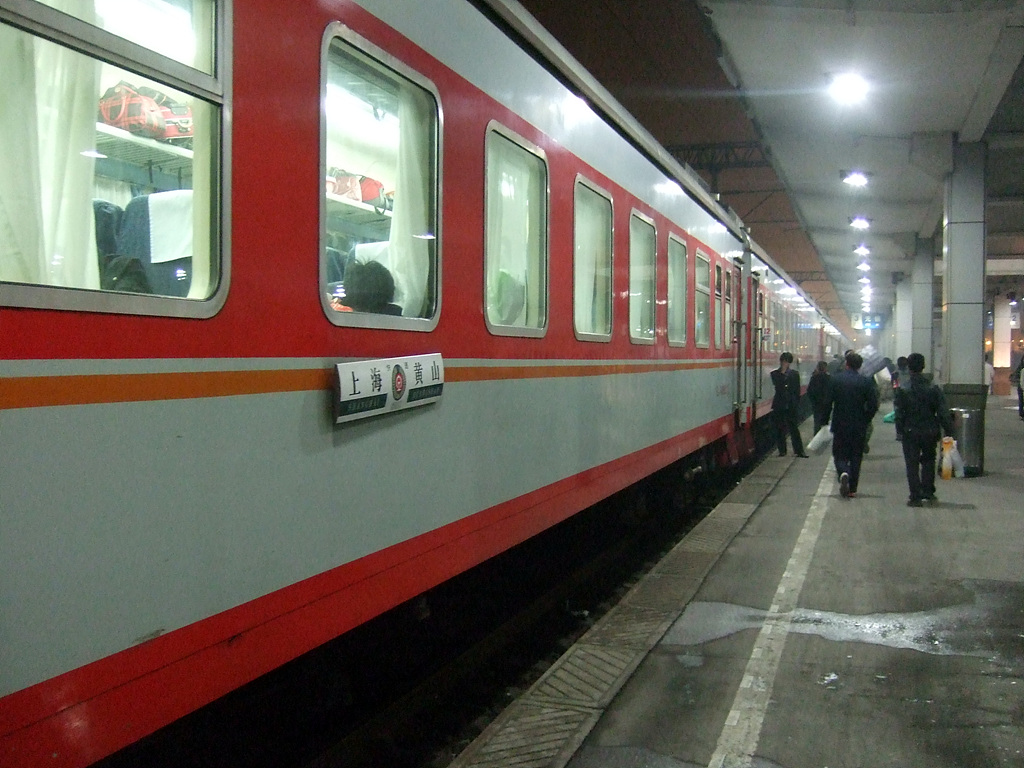
A train on platform 3 (2008)

Shanghai Railway Bureau and the Municipality Government of Wuxi reached an agreement on the reconstruction of the station building in 1978. In 1982, the annual revenue of the station, including passenger and freight service, reached 100.96 million yuan, which made the station one of the 4 stations that reached an annual income of 100 million (Yi) of the Shanghai Railway Bureau. As the part of the transition construction, a new ticket office of 512 square meters (5,510 sq ft) was constructed during November 1981 and June 1982, a new signal house was constructed in 1983 and a temporary waiting room was built in the station square in 1985, 6 ticket counters were added in the same year; meanwhile, the freight services of carload lots were moved to South Gate Freight Yard.

The reconstruction of the station building ultimately started in 1988 and finished on January 25, 1989. The new station occupied the size of 12,500 square meters (135,000 sq ft), with 4 waiting rooms inside. The station yard has 3 platforms and 6 tracks, with the effective lengths of 650 meters (2,132 ft 7 in) each. Each platform has a width of 12 meters (39 ft 4 in), with the 480-long canopy covered over. The station building and the platforms were connected by a flyover and 2 exit undergrounds.

In the 1990s, the station has 80 trains per day and the maximum daily ridership of 38,000 people. In 1999, it was upgraded to the top-class station, which was the only station on Shanghai–Nanjing railway except for Shanghai railway station.

The Municipal Government of Wuxi invest money to renovate the south station square in September 2002, which makes it one of the three large urban transformation projects of Wuxi in the 21st century along with Taihu Avenue and Taihu Plaza. The facade of the south station building was renovated in 2004.

The Non-stop express Z1 and 2 between Beijing and Shanghai added Wuxi Railway Station as the only intermediate stop on July 1, 2005. The electrification construction of the station yard started in 2006, the existing flyover was reconstructed to allow enough space for installing overhead line below. Two platforms were uplifted to "high" at the beginning of 2007. On April 18, after the Sixth Speed Up Campaign, the station began the operation of D-series train on Beijing–Shanghai railway, and had 2 D-trains to Shanghai. On October 21, 2008, Wuxi station is the only intermediate stop for the first EMU Sleeper train D301/2 of China Railway.

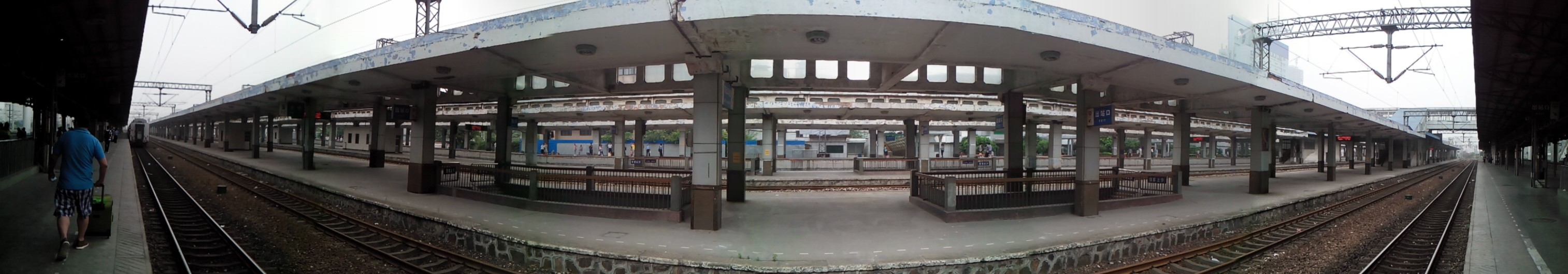
Panorama of the Conventional Yard Platforms (2014 unmodified)

=== North Station Building Construction and Comprehensive Revonation ===
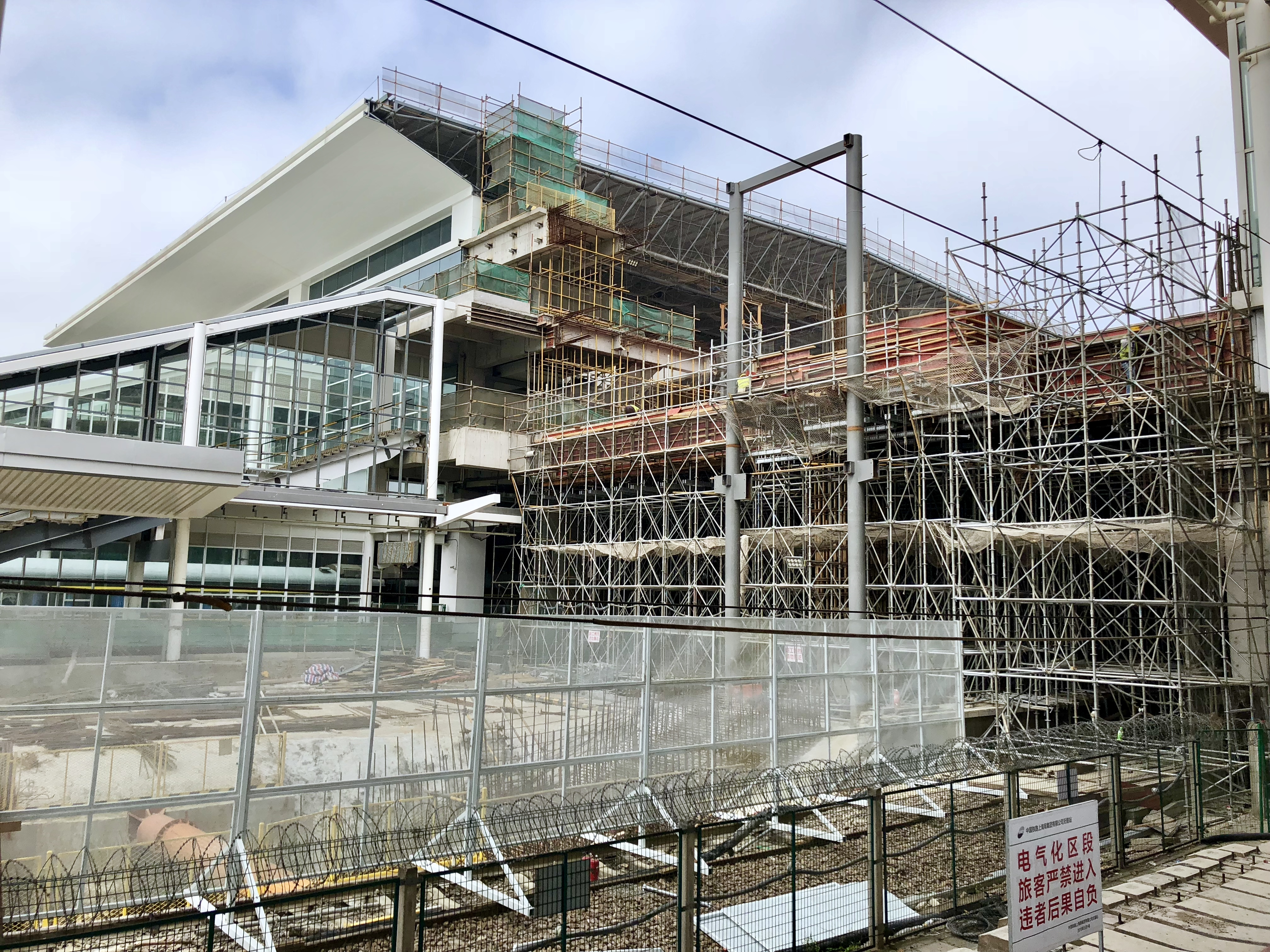
The south station building and conventional yard under renovation (June 2018)

CR Siyuan Design Group and Wuxi Plan and Design Institute made a comprehensive plan of the Wuxi Railway Station in 2006. The plan revealed that with the construction of the Shanghai–Nanjing intercity railway, the station would have a new Intercity-yard, north station building and a transportation hub consist of bus and metro in Zhoushanbang, which was located north to the existing station. The north station building serves the intercity railway was opened on July 1, 2010, and formed a transportation hub of 225 mu with the long-distance coach station, local bus terminal and the metro station.

The Municipal Government of Wuxi planned to have a comprehensive Renovation of the Wuxi Station right after the completion of the north station building. The Renovation consisted of the construction of the south station building of 41,000 square meters (440,000 sq ft) and the construction of the column-less canopy over the conventional train platforms. However, the renovation of the south station building (and the conventional yard) was unable to be started right after the opening of the north station yard, which made the station had two parts that were relatively individual to each other and caused confusion to passengers. In 2012, the planning department modified the comprehensive renovation plan to "renovate the south station building and construct ordinary canopies over the conventional train platforms" due to the consideration of the budgets.

The comprehensive renovation of the south station was officially started in May 2016, some of the conventional trains stopped its passenger services at Wuxi Railway Station. On September 8, the flyover over the conventional yard was started to tear down. The renovation of the conventional yard were started afterward by the order of south to north: platform 1 and 2 was re-opened on July 18, 2018, and the southern part of the new waiting room that is above the conventional yard tracks was opened on February 6. The entire renovation was completed on December 10, 2018. Plus, a new ticket counters located on the first floor of the north station building were oepend on May 20, 2017.

== Station Layout ==
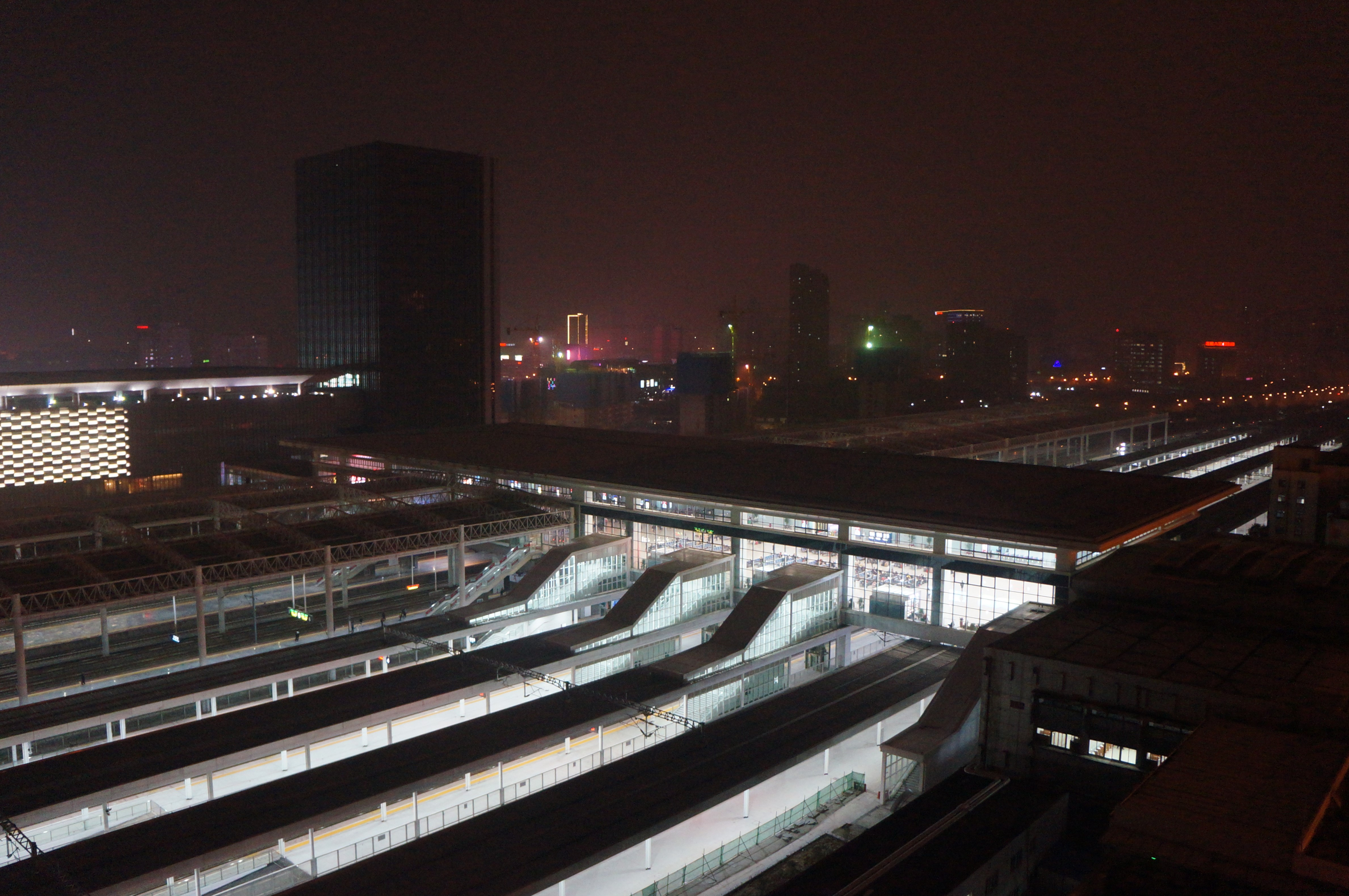
Overview of the station

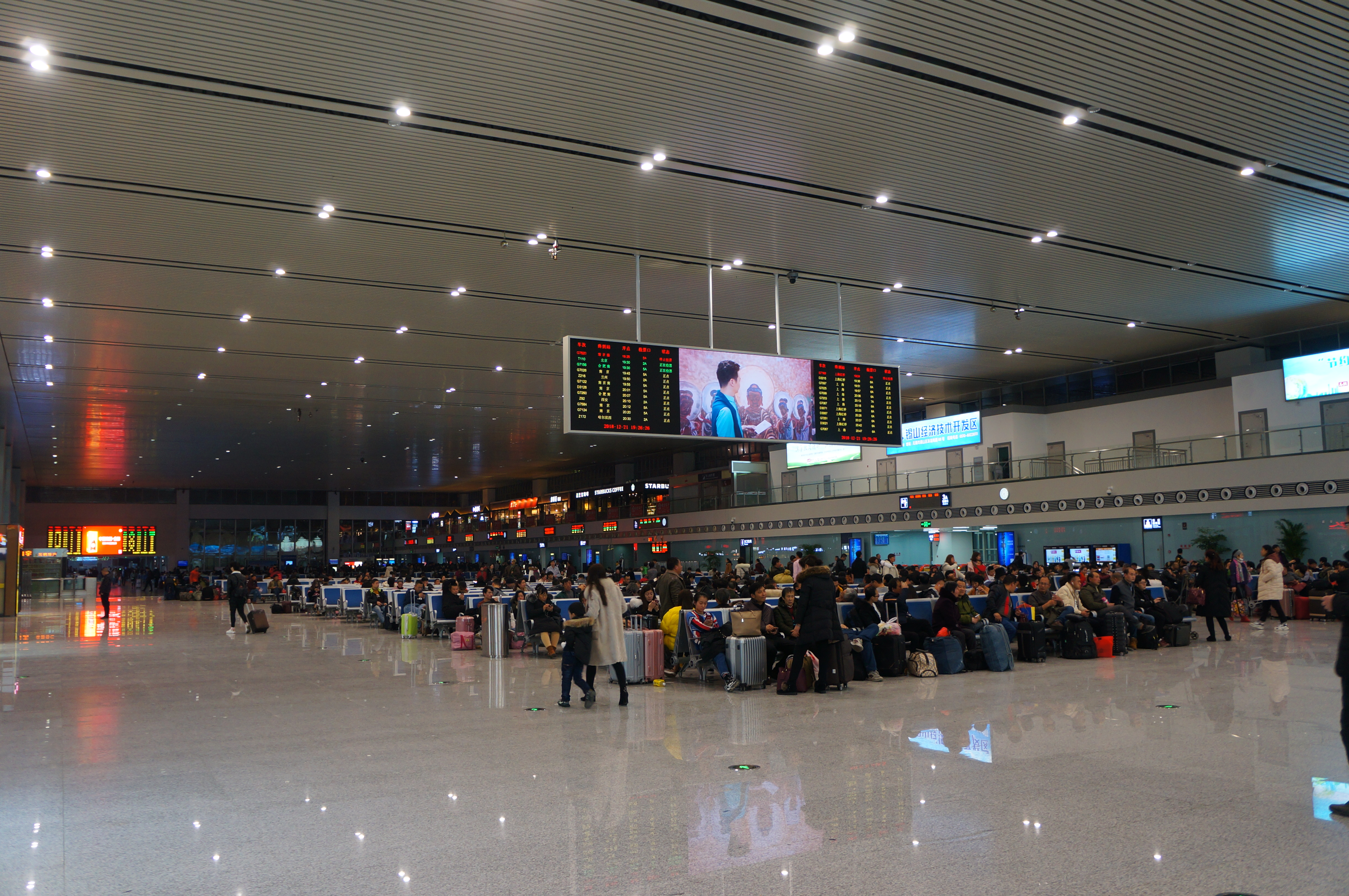
Waiting Room over the tracks

Wuxi Railway Station has two parts: the southern part serving the conventional Beijing–Shanghai railway, and the northern part serving the Shanghai–Nanjing intercity railway. Two parts of the station were connected by a flyover and tunnels.

=== Station Building ===
Wuxi Railway Station has two station buildings connected by an elevated waiting room over the tracks. The passenger flow within the station follows the principle of "Departure up, Arrival down". The entire size of the waiting room reaches 18,000 square meters (190,000 sq ft), the area above the track are 13,000 square meters (140,000 sq ft). It can afford the daily ridership of 120,000 passengers.

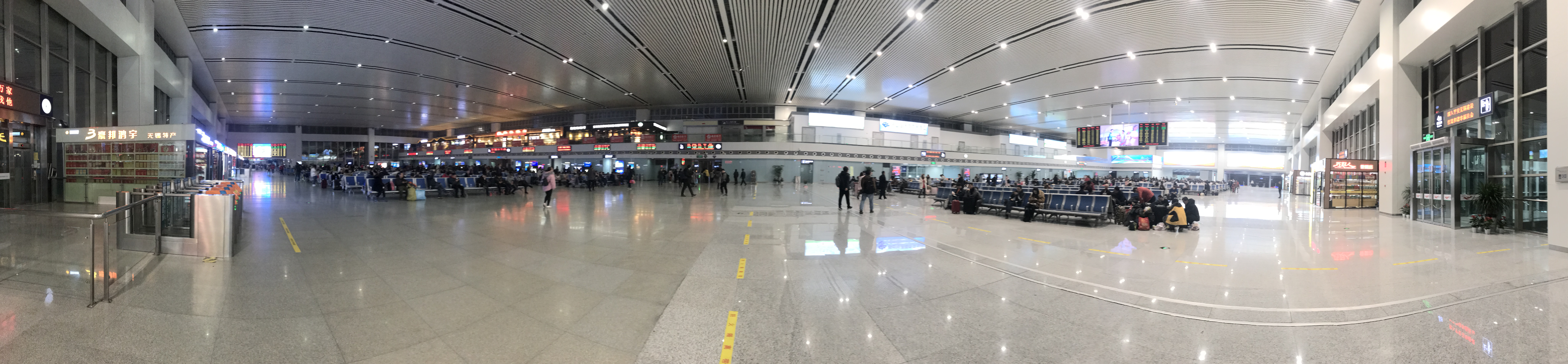
The panorama of the elevated waiting room over the tracks（2018）.

==== South Station Building ====
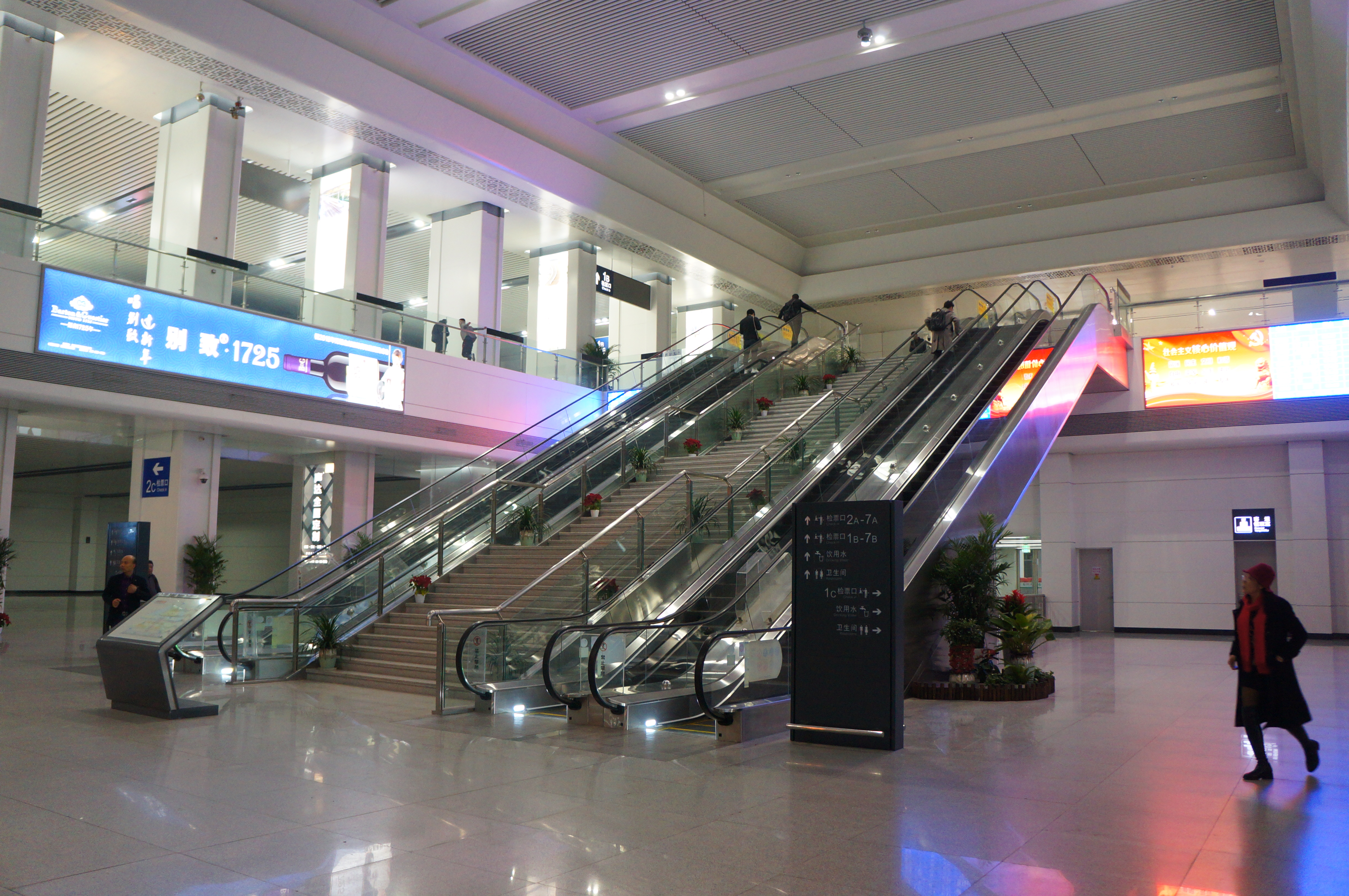
Entrance of the south station building

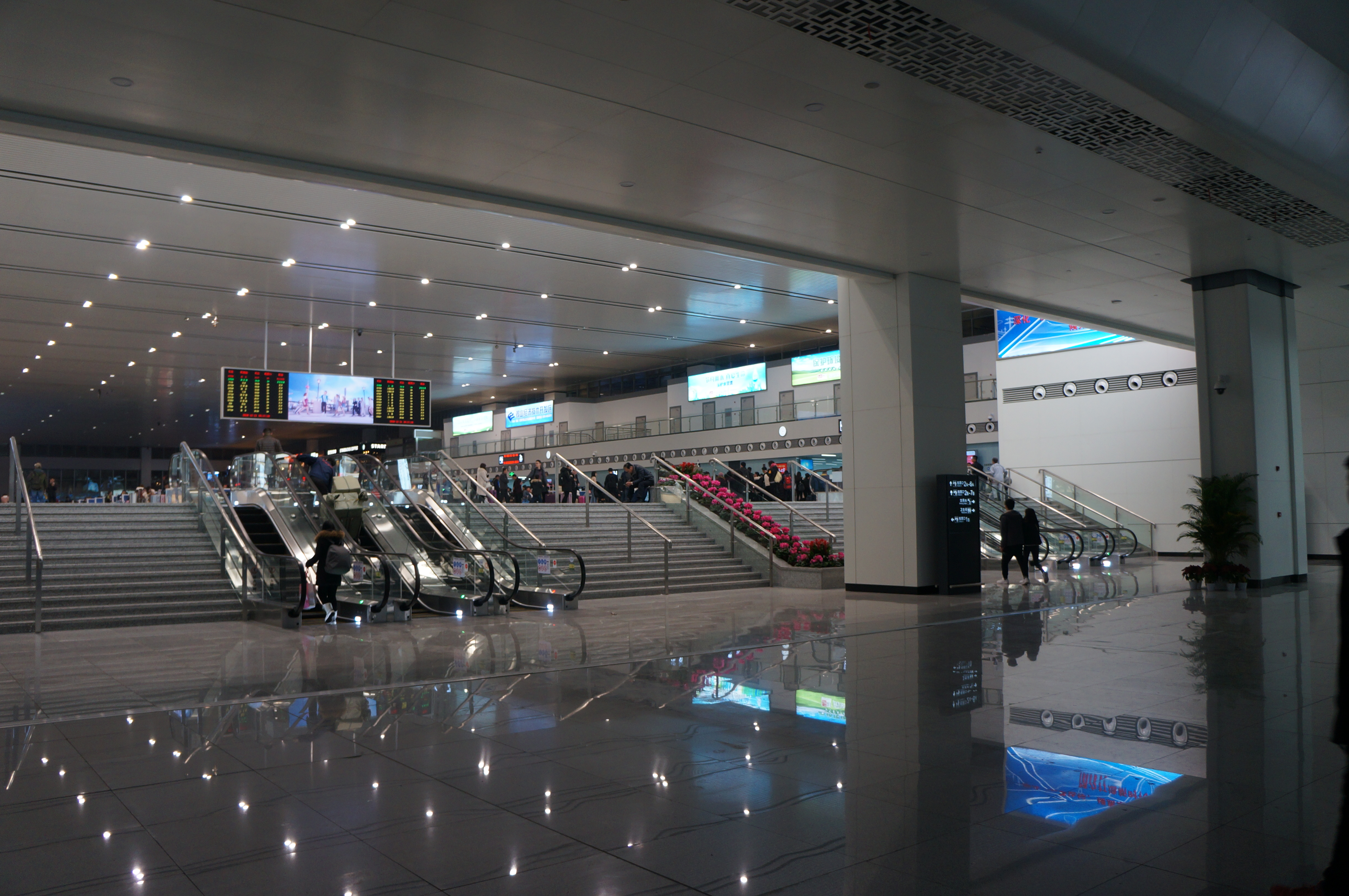
South Entrance to the Elevated waiting room

The south station building of Wuxi Railway Station was constructed in 1988, with renovations in connection area and facade in 2002 and 2004. It has the length in 140 meters (459 ft 4 in) and height in 22.8 meters (74 ft 10 in). The south station building had an interior re-decorations in 2017 during the comprehensive renovation. The ticket room was located on the west side of the station building, with 11 counters and 13 ticket terminals; there is another ticketing area with terminals only on the east side of the building. The entrance is located in the center of the south station building. Under the door awning is the security area with 4 lines. The former waiting rooms of the south station building after the renovation becomes the spare area of the lower-east hall and lower-west hall. The B1 floor is the arrival area with several stores, there are 10 ticket gates in the south exit. In the south station square, the drop-off area was in the eastern part, while the bus terminal is located on the both side.

The calligraphy station name sign hangs in the south station was written by a local artist Wang Jihe. He wrote the name for free under the request by the construction people in 1987 during the reconstruction of the third generation of the station building. He also wrote the sign of "Exit", "Question area" and "Ticket Area" except for the station name. Then his works were transformed to 2.5-by-2.5-meter (8 ft 2 in × 8 ft 2 in) ceramic pieces for each character by Yixing Factory of Fine Pottery and hung on the station building. The signs were changed to brass-made material in 2001. After the facade renovation of 2005, the signs were replaced by the computer fonts and caused the controversies among local citizens, then the station re-produced the calligraphy signs with English names using acrylic glass afterward. The calligraphy sign is still placed on the south station building, making contrast to the signs in SimLi in the north station building.

In 2023, the renovation and construction of the underground passage, square and surrounding buildings in the south square of the station will begin.

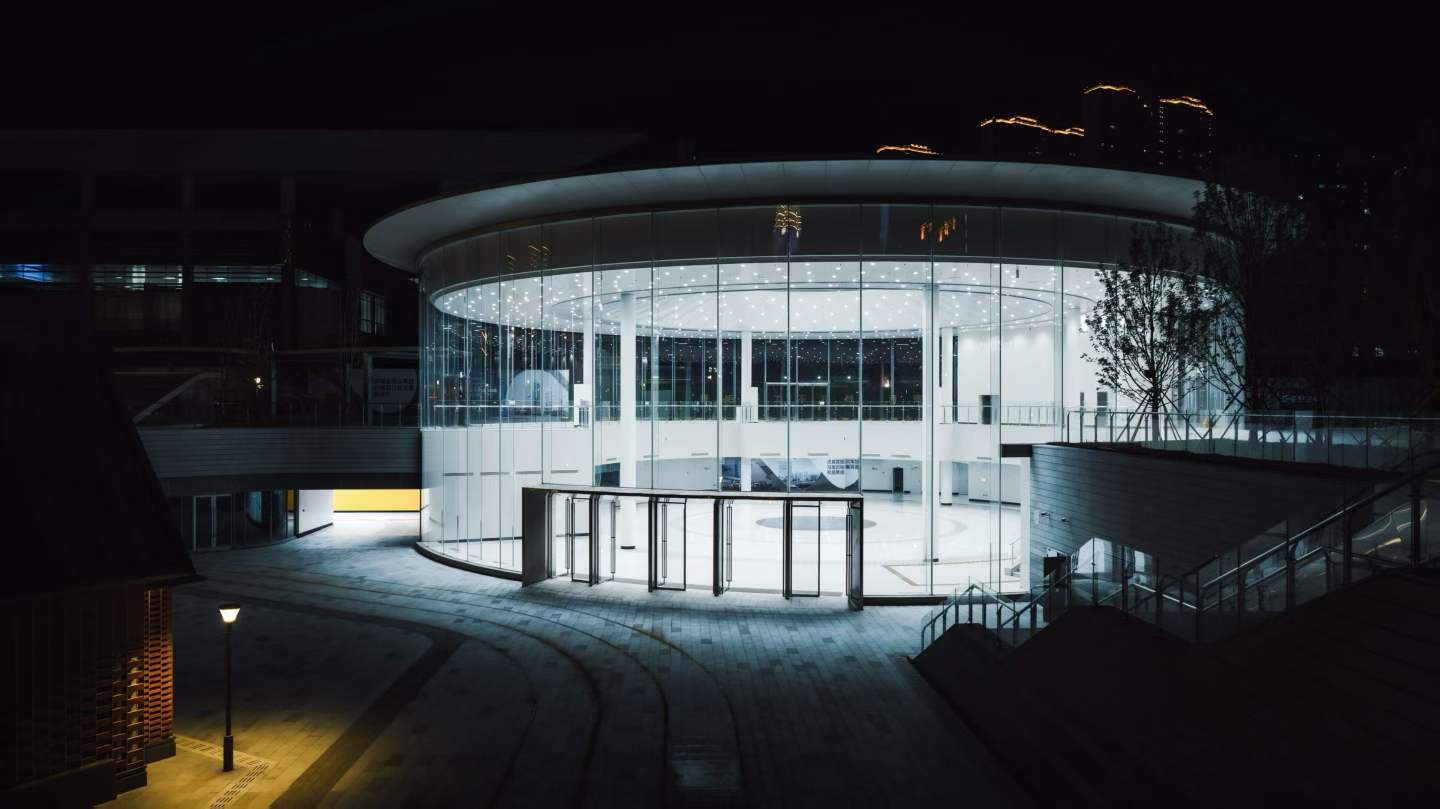
Door Awning of the Southern Entrance

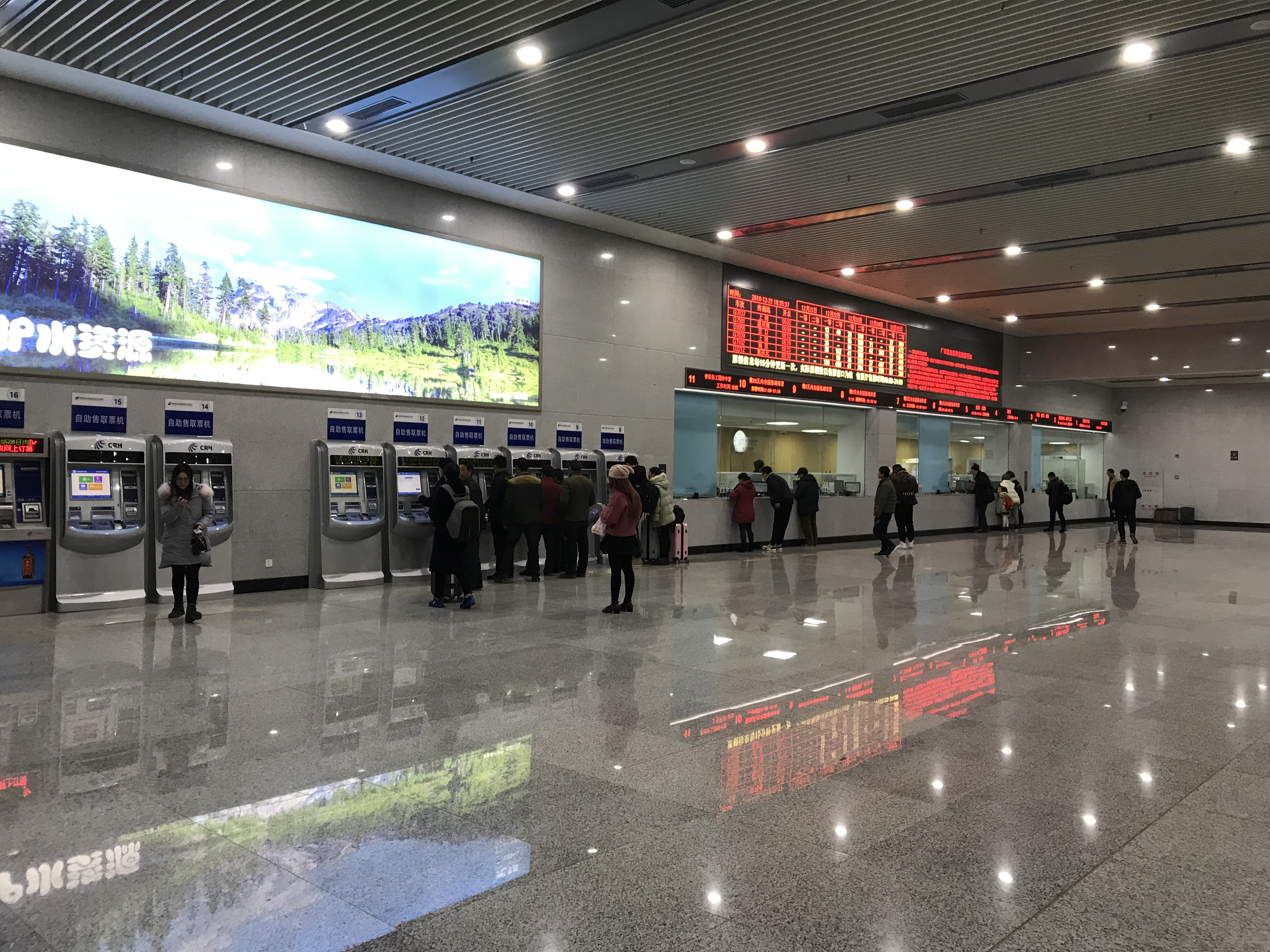
Ticket House South

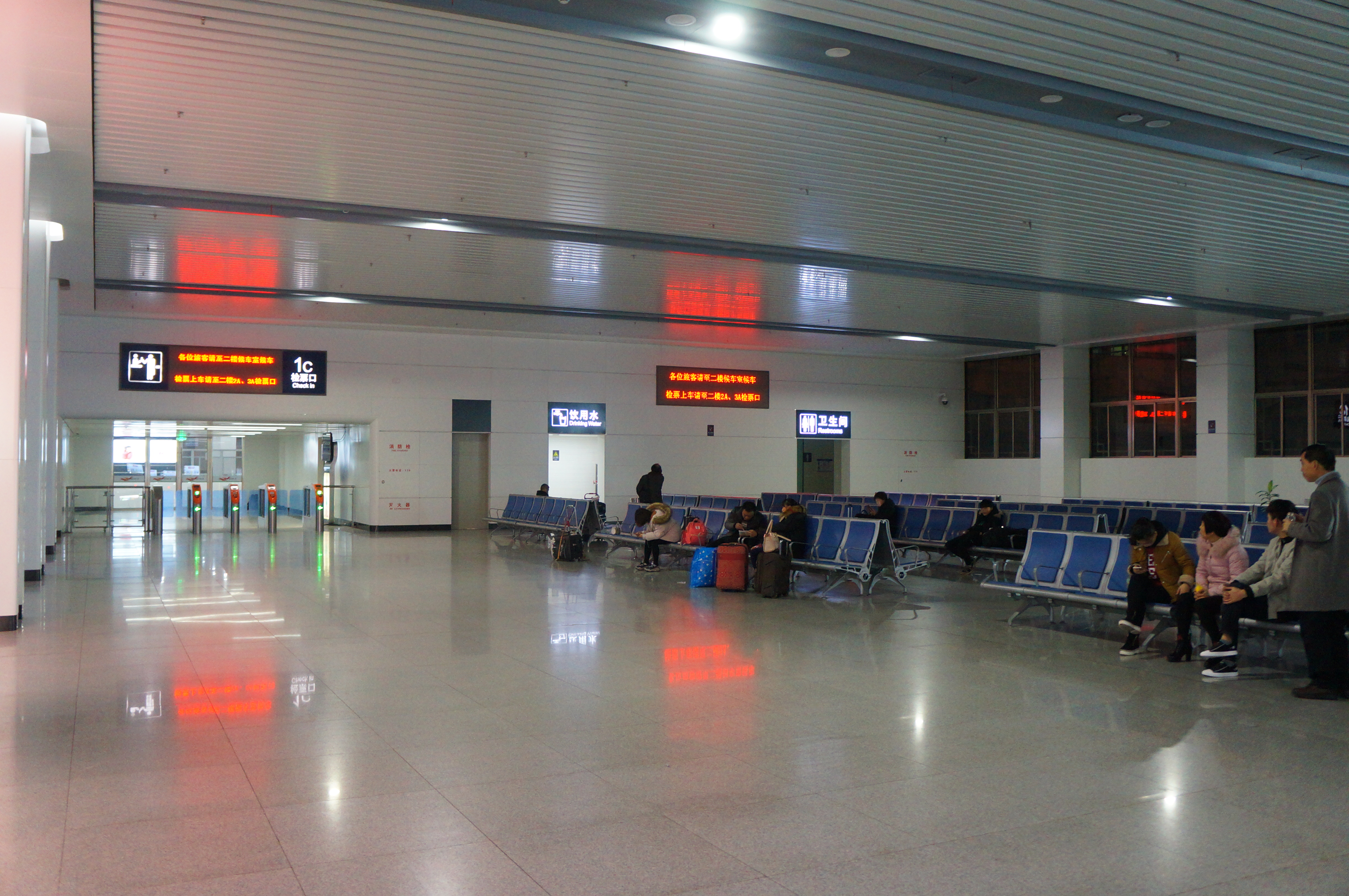
The reserved Waiting Room 1C in lower-east hall

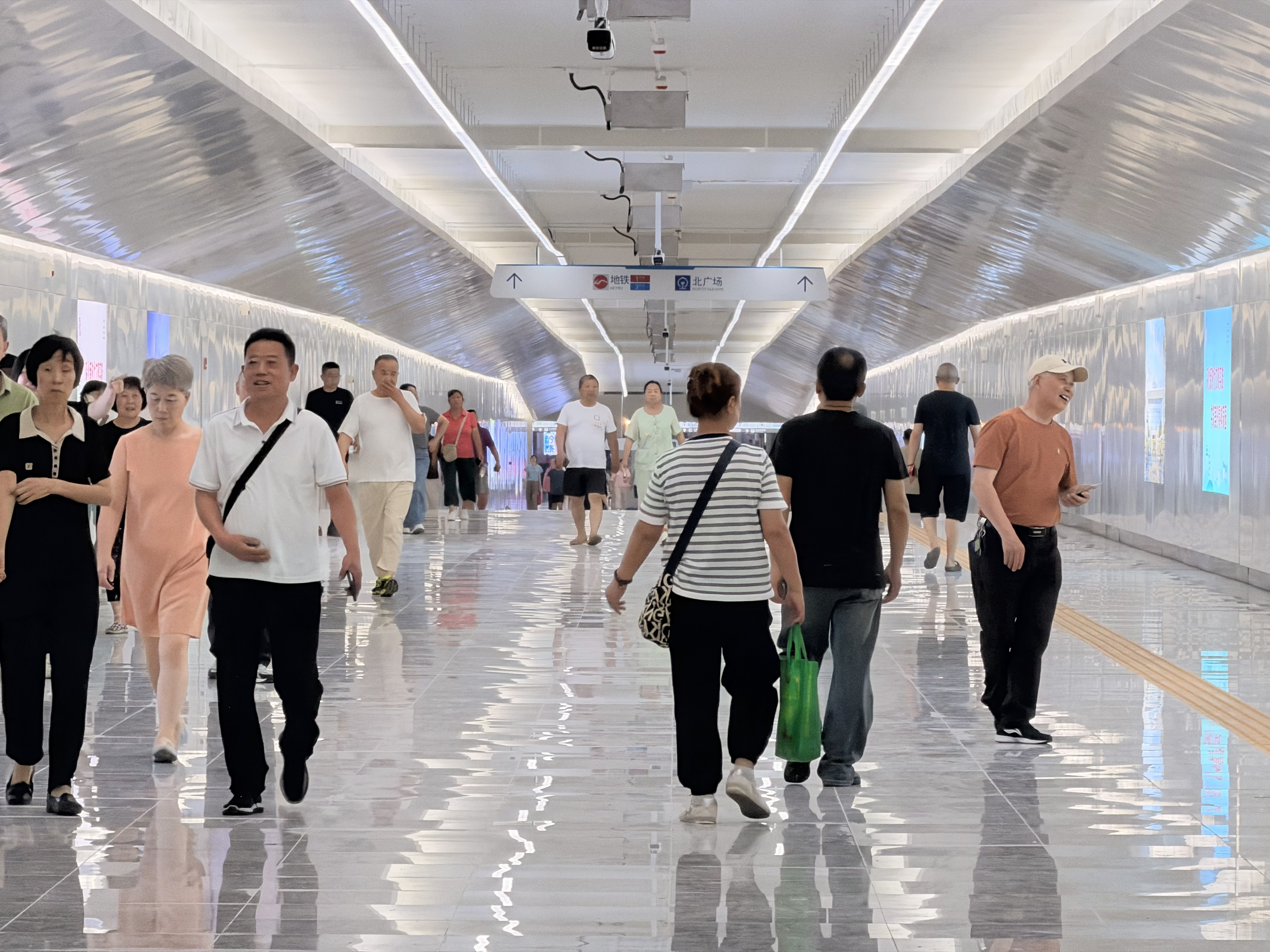
Southern Exit

==== North Station Building ====
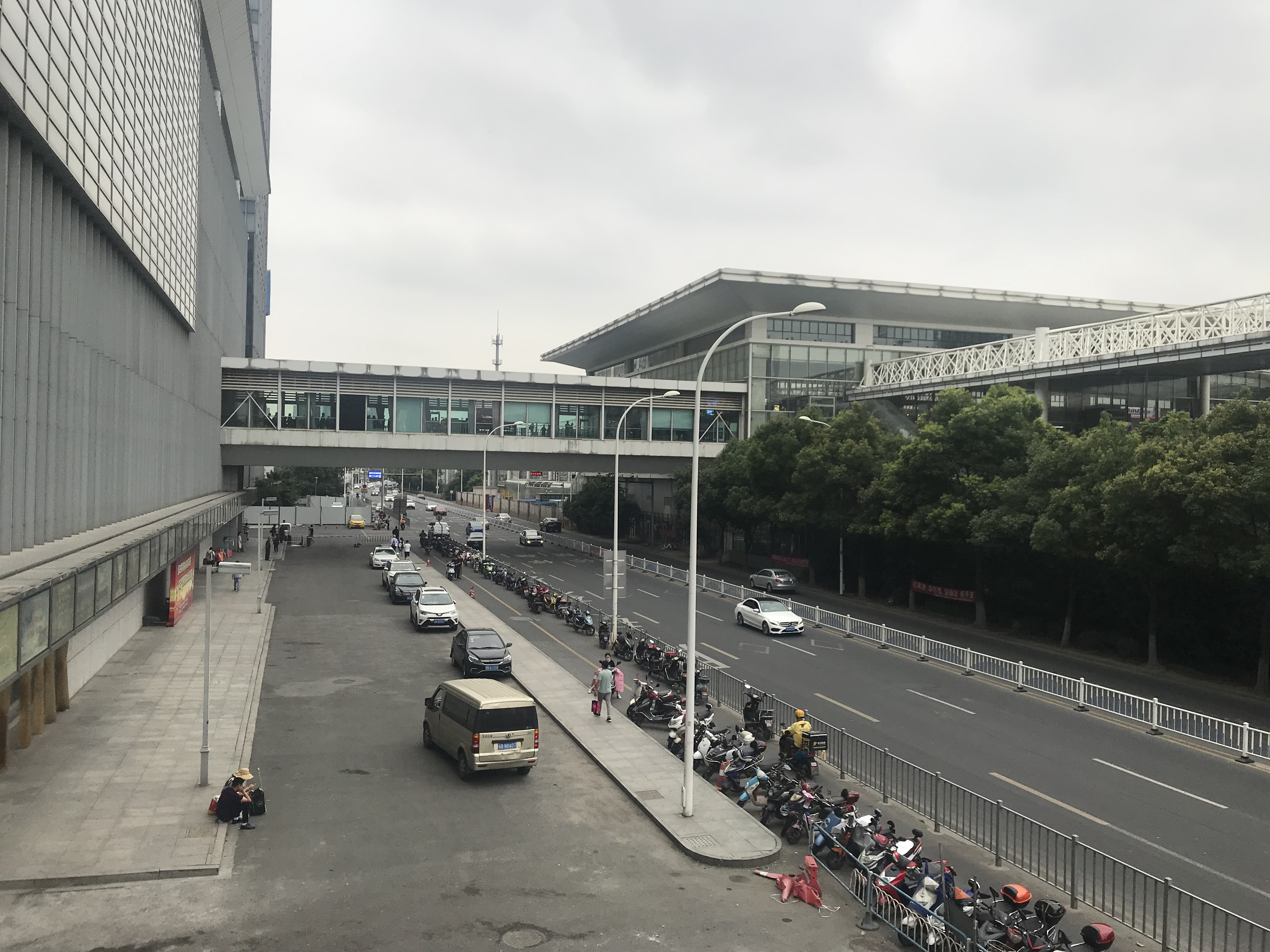
North Station building near Xingchang Road

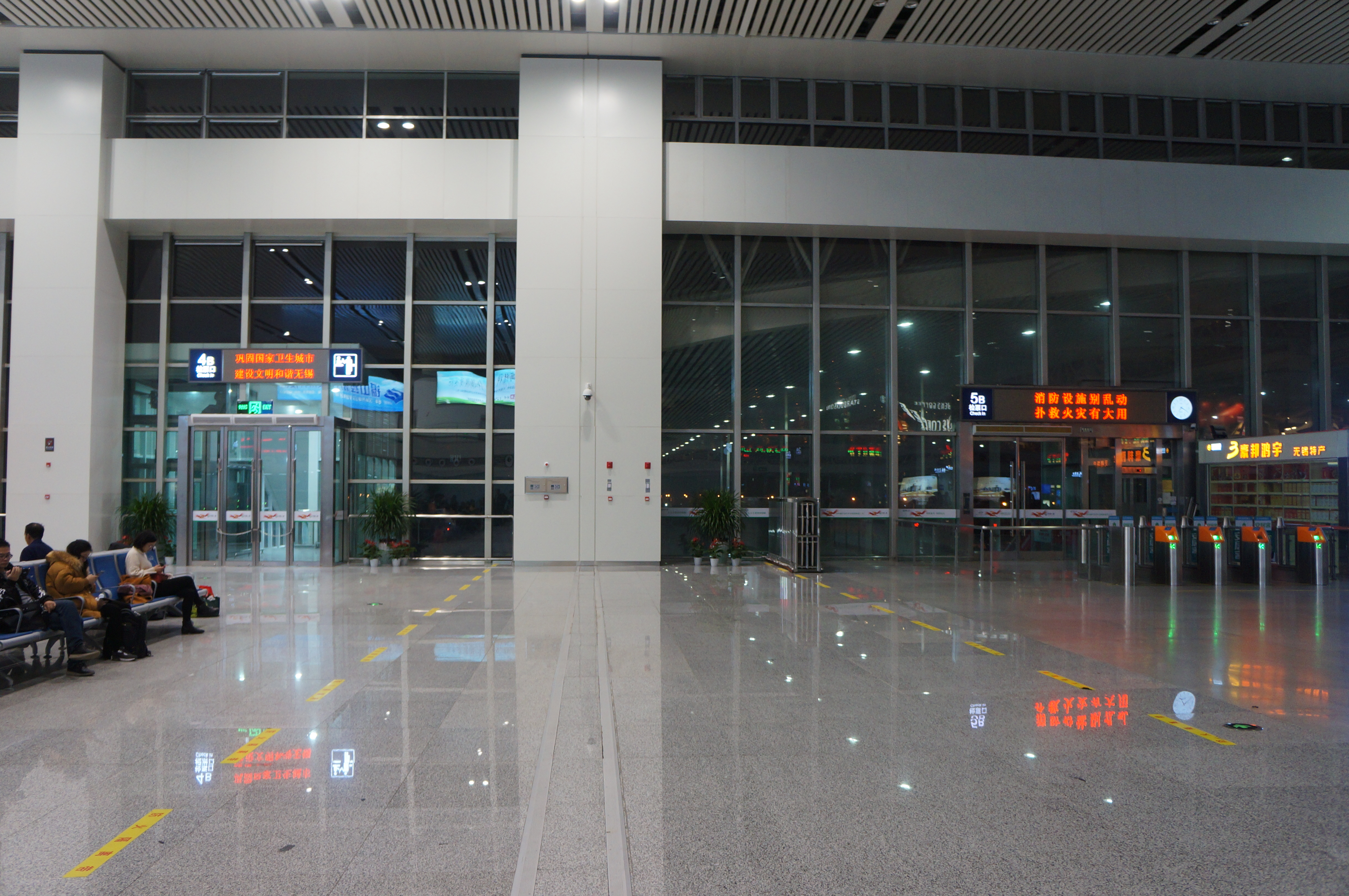
Boarding gates

The north station building was opened in 2010, and the part of the transportation hub Wuxi Central Station, operates between 6:00 and 23:00. The departure was located on the third floor, which consists of a ticket room and the entrance. The ticket room has a size of 1000 square meters, 13 counters and 10 ticket terminals. The north station and the elevated waiting room was connected by a flyover over the Xingchang Road. The exit was located on the -1 Floor. There is an additional ticket room located on the first floor opened in 2017 to release the lines of the 3rd floor ticket room. The new ticket room has the size of 1,000 square meters, 10 ticket terminals and 8 pick-up terminals.

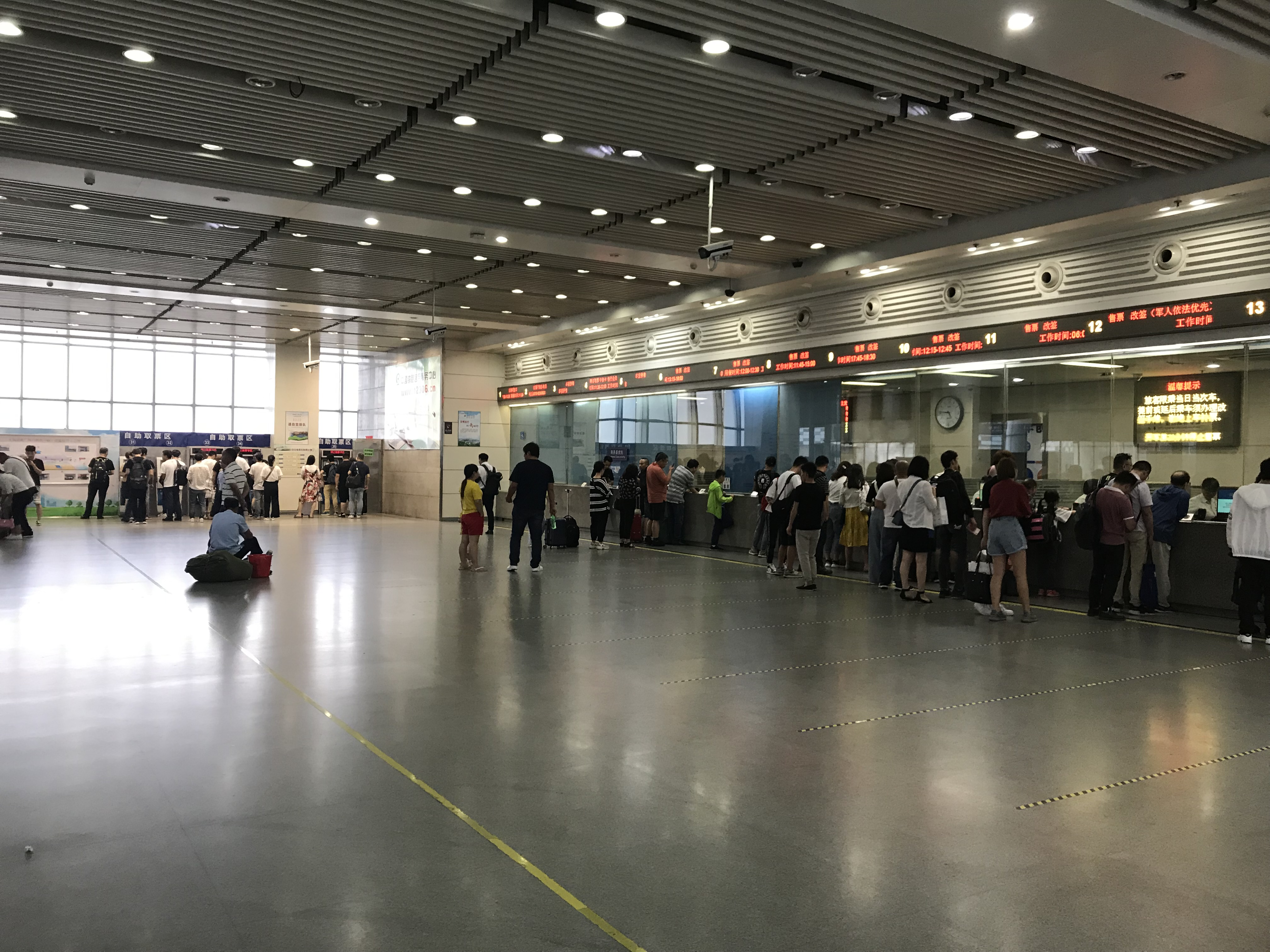
Ticket Office North on 3F

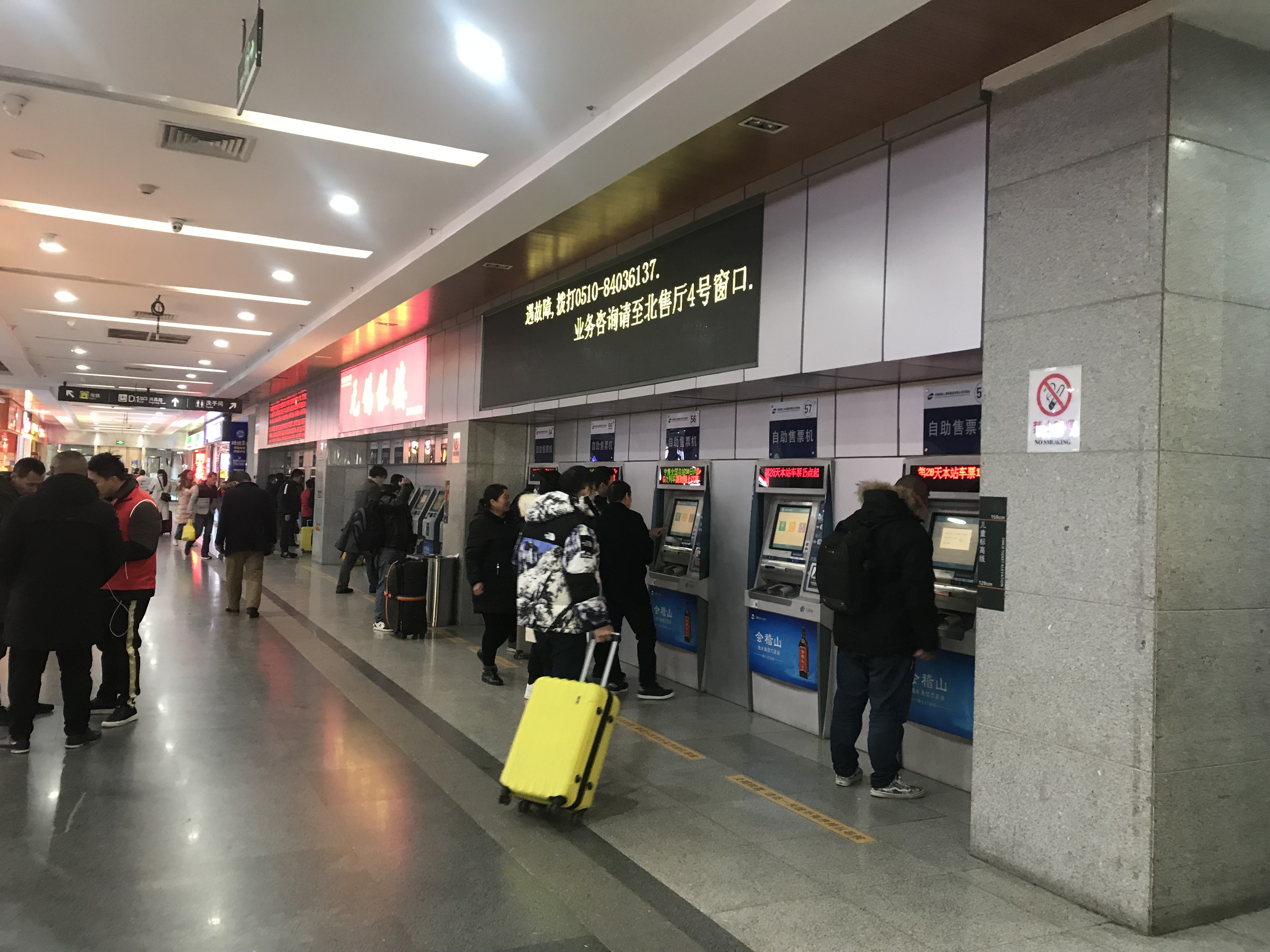
Ticket terminals on 1F of the north station building

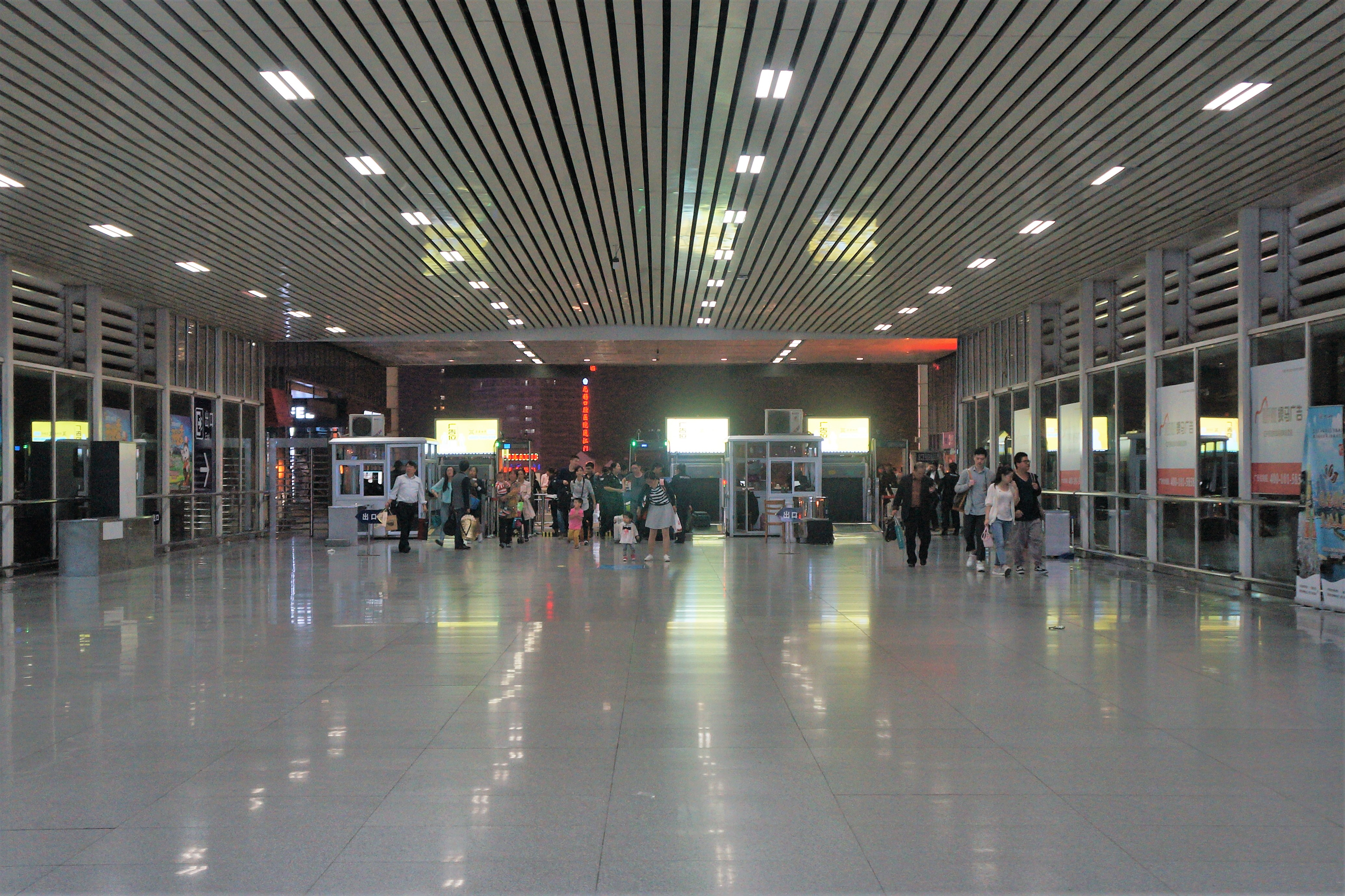
Security of the north station building, located on a flyover over the Xingchang Road

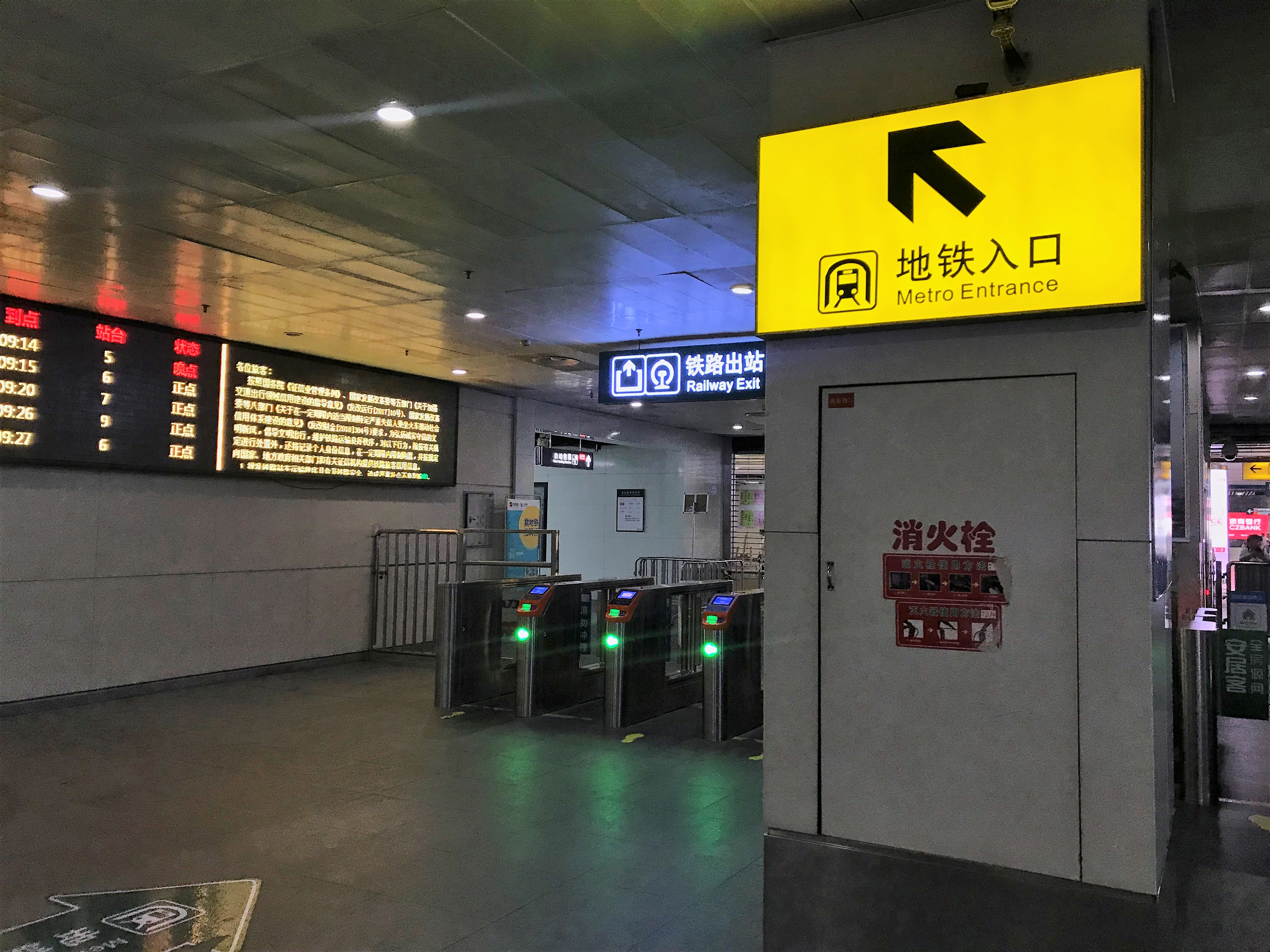
Exit gates to the metro concourse

=== Platforms ===
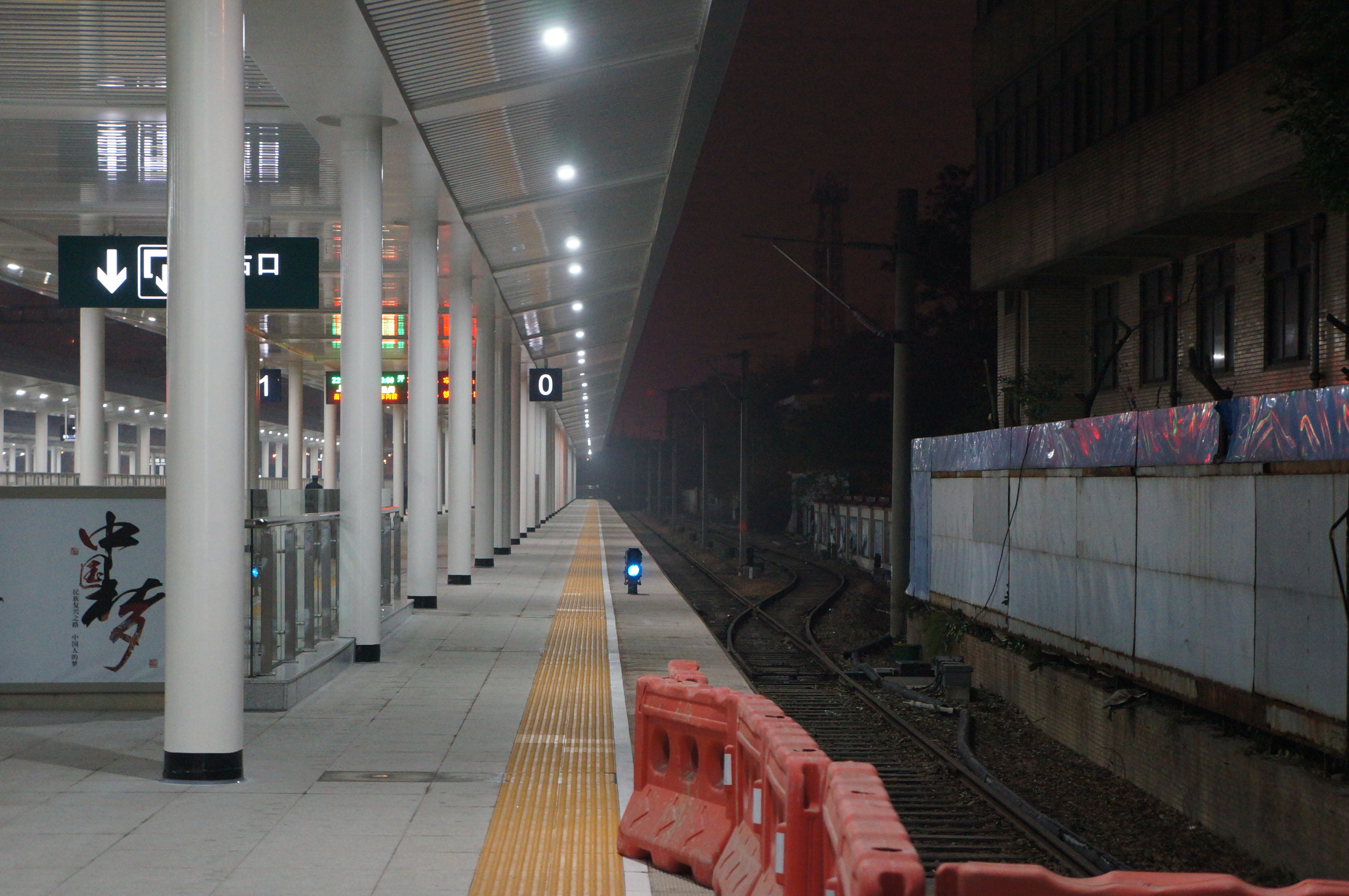
"Platform 0" of Wuxi Railway Station

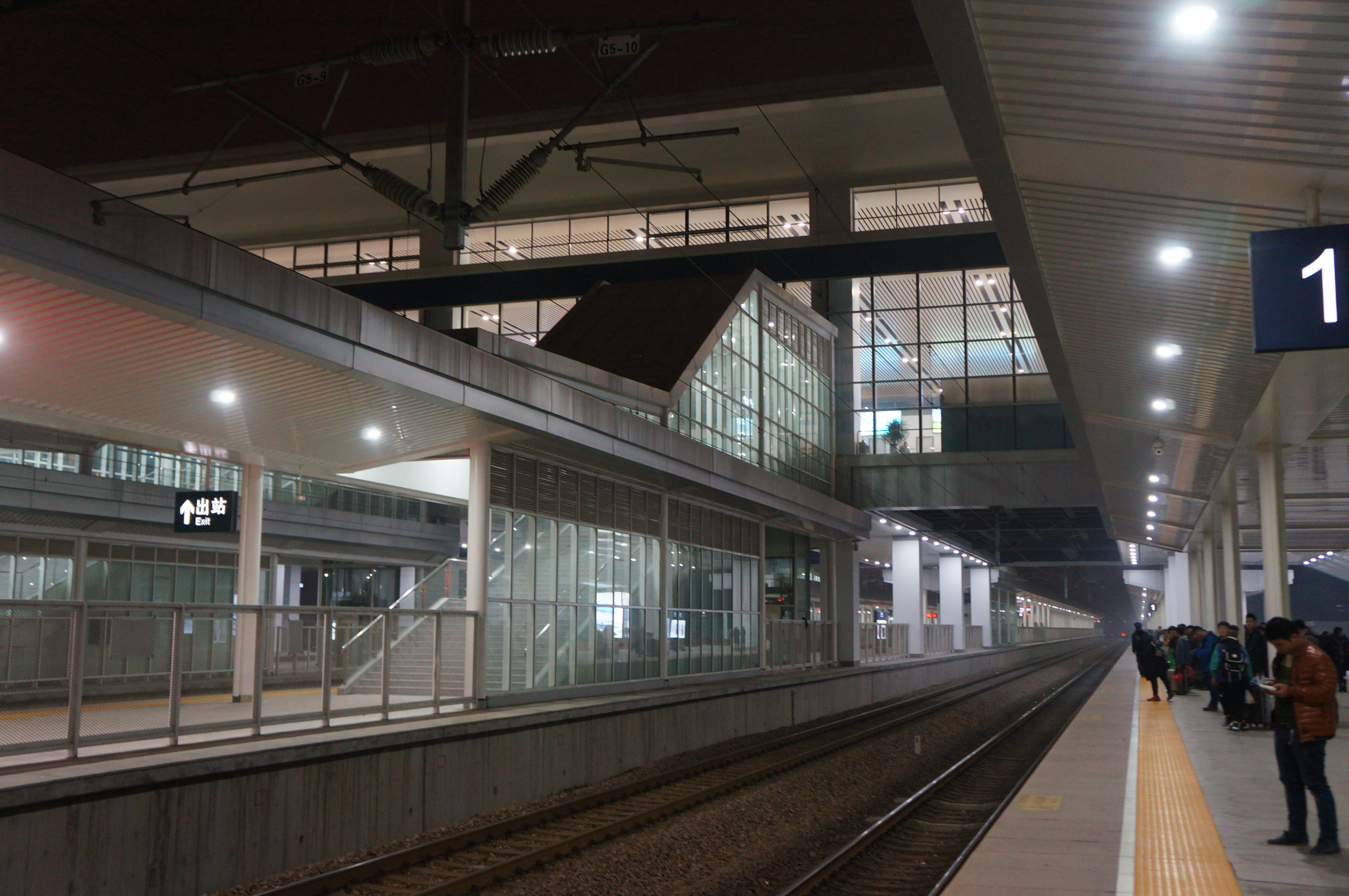
Platform 1, inbound mainline and the elevated platform above

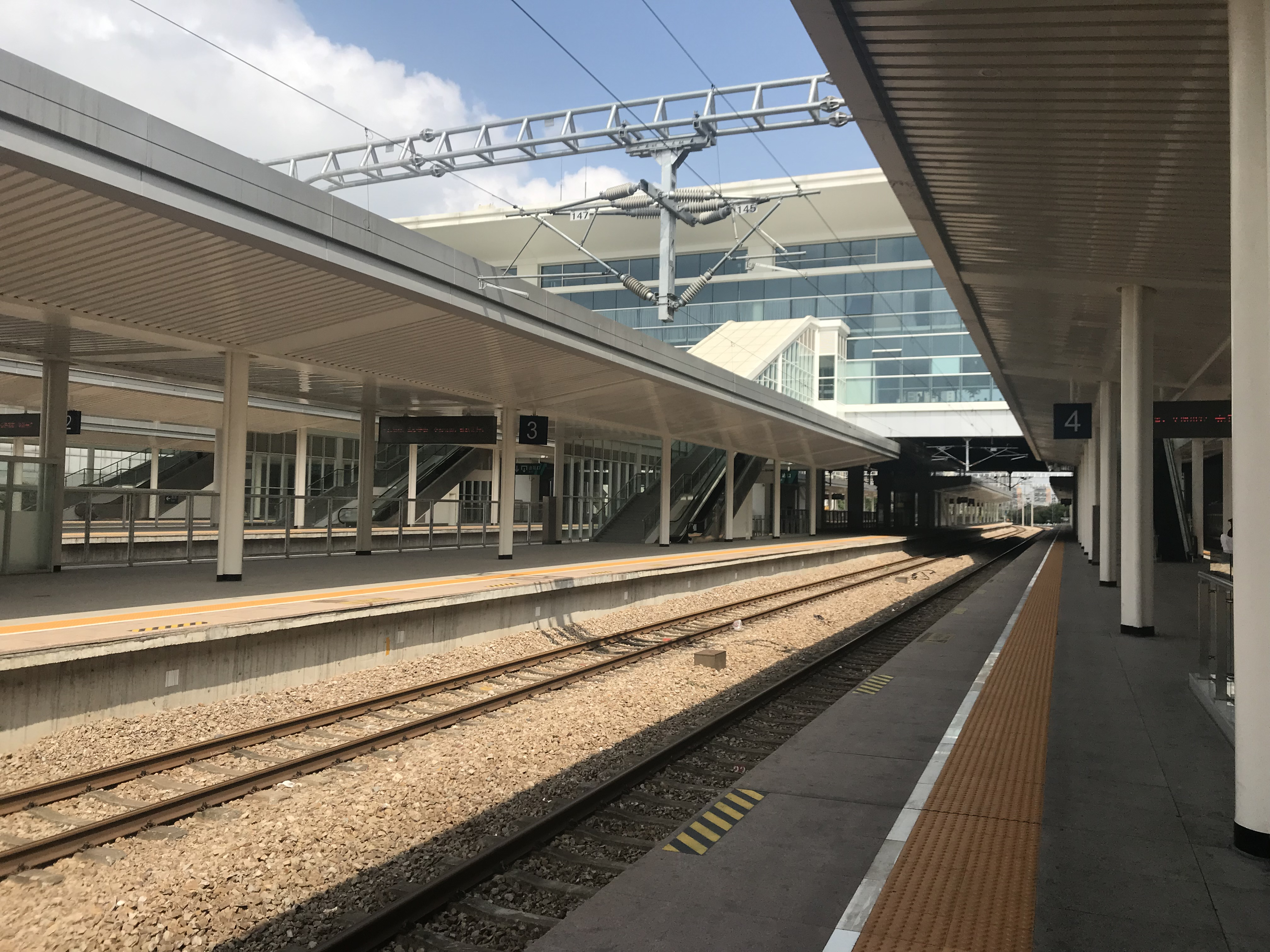
Platform 3, 4 of the Conventional Yard

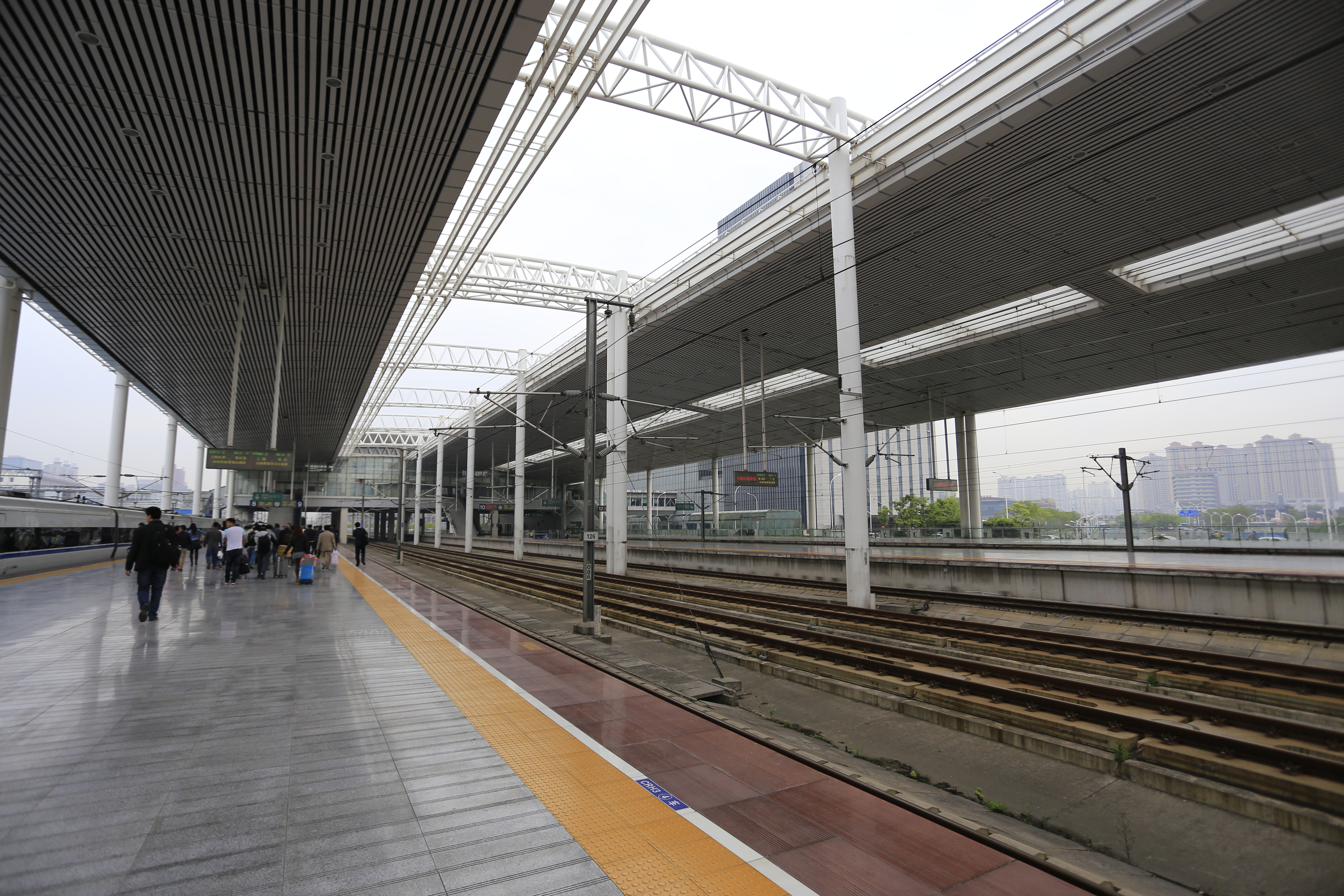
Platforms of the Intercity Yard

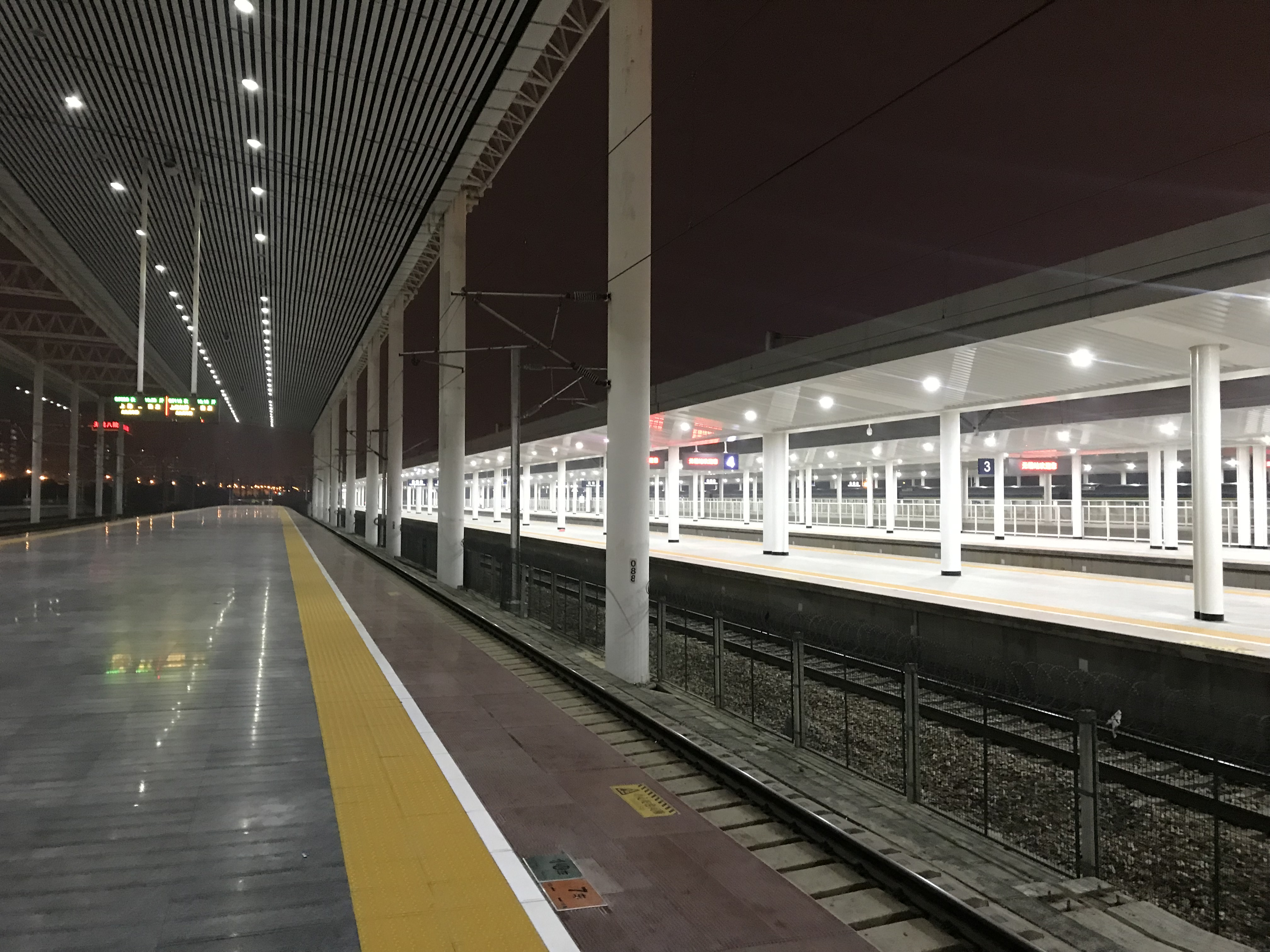
Platforms of the both conventional and intercity yard

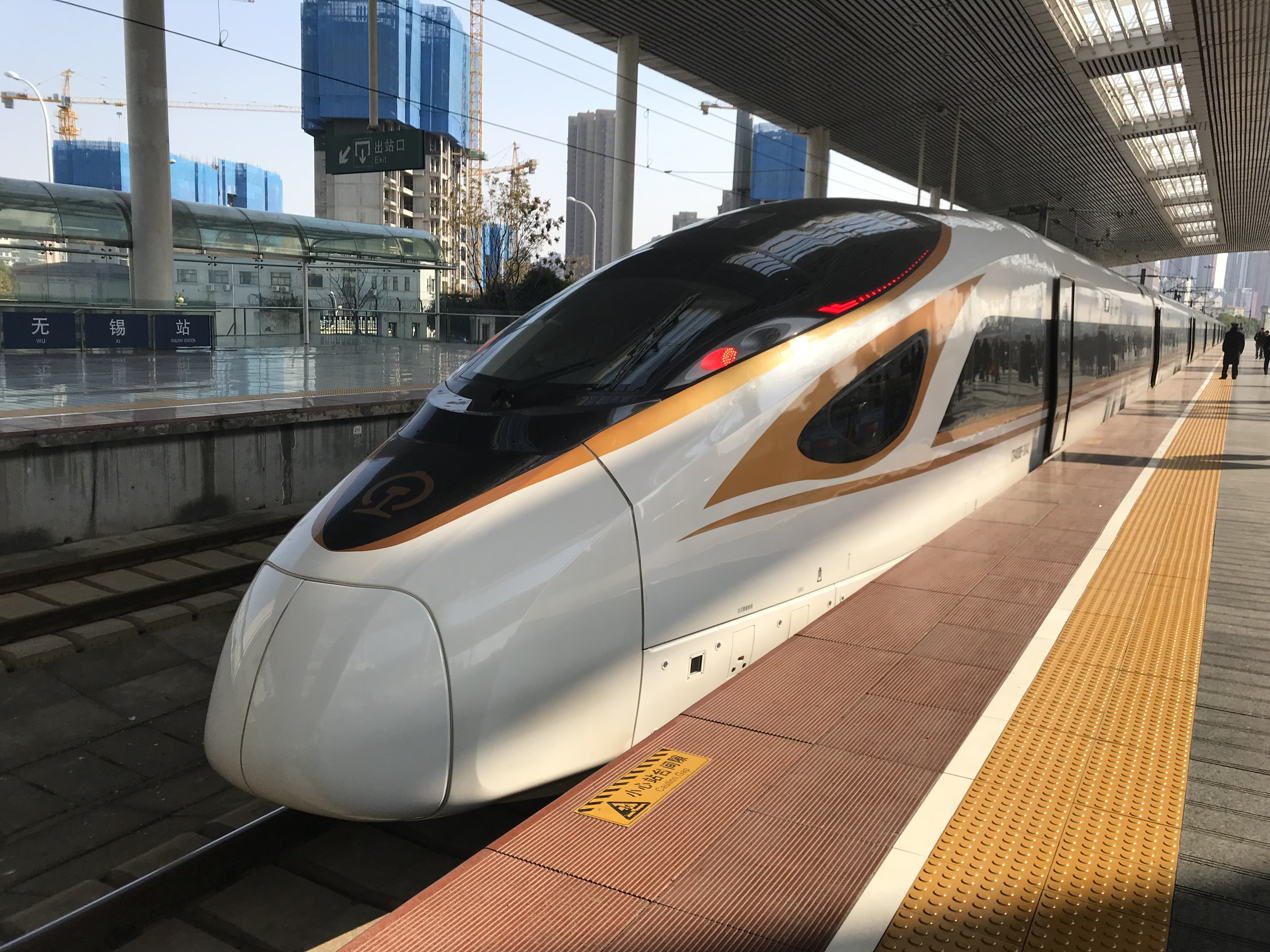
G7111 on the platform 9 of intercity yard

Wuxi Railway Station has "Conventional Train Yard" and "Intercity Yard". The conventional yard as Beijing–Shanghai railway passing by, with 4 platforms and 7 tracks. The conventional yard has 4 platforms (including 1 side platform and 3 island platforms) numbered as 0 to 5 covered by 4 550-meter-long canopies. Intercity yard has 3 platforms and 7 tracks, including 2 mainlines and 5 tracks for passenger services. It has 2 island platforms and 1 side platform number from 6 to 10.

In addition, there is a dead-end track located beside the platform 1 of the conventional yard numbered as "platform 0", this track were used for trains departing here for Shanghai direction, currently, it is only for turnaround trains. The conventional trains used to have industrial lines to Building Material Company, Resin Factory, the Industrial Line to Building Material Company has branches to storage. Those industrial lines were demolished after the construction of the Intercity yard.

Side platform
Platform 10	Huning HSR to Shanghai direction (Wuxi New Area)
Platform 9	Huning HSR to Shanghai direction (Wuxi New Area)
Island platform
Platform 8	Huning HSR to Shanghai direction (Wuxi New Area)
Mainline	Huning HSR Outbound passing trains
Mainline	Huning HSR Inbound passing trains
Platform 7	Huning HSR to Nanjing direction (Huishan)
Island platform
Platform 6	Huning HSR to Nanjing direction (Huishan)
Platform 5	Jinghu Railway to Shanghai direction (Wuxi South)
Island platform
Platform 4	Jinghu Railway to Shanghai direction (Wuxi South)
Mainline	Jinghu Railway Ountound passing trains
Island platform
Platform 3	Jinghu Railway to Shanghai direction (Wuxi South)
Platform 2	Jinghu Railway to Beijing direction (Wuxi North)
Island platform
Mainline	Jinghu Railway Inbound passing trains
Platform 1	Jinghu Railway to Beijing direction (Wuxi North)
Side platform

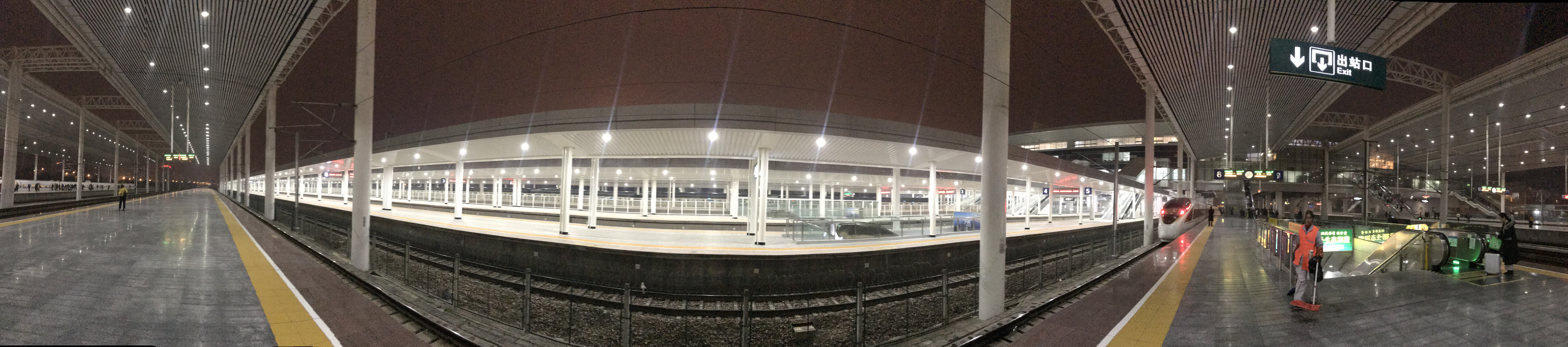
Panorama of the platforms (2018 Completed)

== Metro station ==
Wuxi Railway Station 无锡火车站
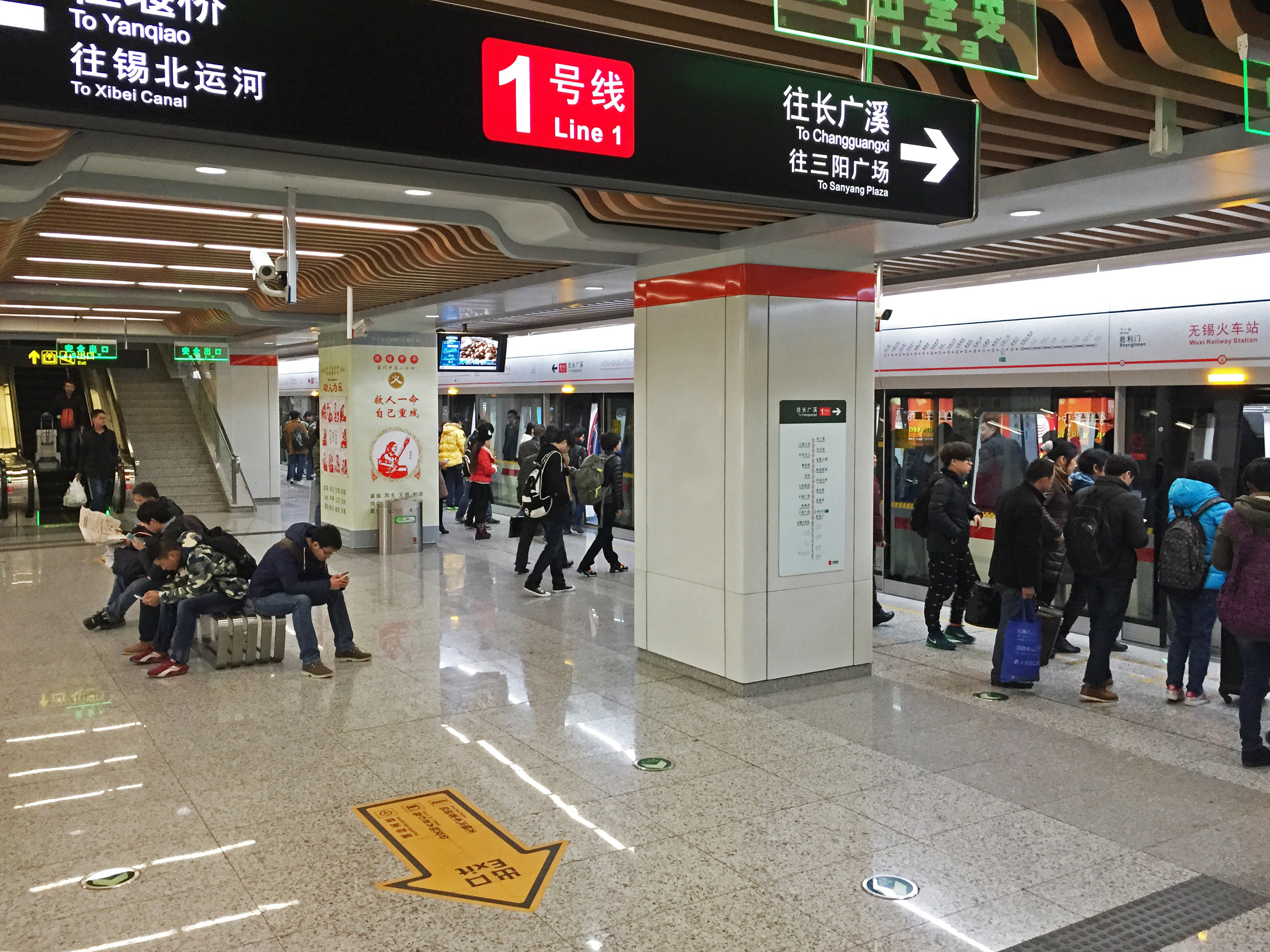
- Line 1 platform

General information
- Location: Chong'an District, Wuxi, Jiangsu; China
- Operator: Wuxi Metro Corporation
- Lines: Line 1; Line 3
- Platforms: 4 (2 island platforms)

Construction
- Structure type: Underground

Other information
- Station code: L108

History
- Opened: 1 July 2014

Services
Preceding station	Wuxi Metro	Following station
Minfeng towards Yanqiao	Line 1	Shenglimen towards Nanfangquan
Beizhakou towards Sumiao	Line 3	Guangrui towards Sunan Shuofang International Airport
Location

Wuxi railway station is served by a station of the same name on Line 1 and Line 3 of Wuxi Metro. It started operations on 1 July 2014.

=== Station Layout ===
B1	Station Hall; Exits	Service Center, Top Up Center for Citizen Card, Ticket vending machine, Elevator, Toilet, Shops
B2	West	←█ towards Sumiao
B2	Island Platform, doors will open on the left ↓Escalator (To B3 █ Line 1 platform)
B2	East	█ towards Sunan Shuofang International Airport→

B3	North	←█ towards Yanqiao
B3	Island Platform, doors will open on the left ↑Escalator (To B2 █ Line 3 platform)
B3	South	█ towards Nanfangquan→

=== Exits ===
There are four exits for this station.

Preceding station	China Railway High-speed	Following station
Wuxi New Area towards Shanghai or Shanghai Hongqiao	Shanghai–Nanjing intercity railway Part of the Shanghai–Wuhan–Chengdu passenger-dedicated railway	Huishan towards Nanjing
Preceding station	China Railway	Following station
Wuxi North towards Beijing	Beijing–Shanghai railway	Wuxi South towards Shanghai

Preceding station	Wuxi Metro	Following station
Minfeng towards Yanqiao	Line 1	Shenglimen towards Nanfangquan
Beizhakou towards Sumiao	Line 3	Guangrui towards Sunan Shuofang International Airport
