= Qishuyan railway station =

Railway station in Jiangsu, China

Qishuyan 戚墅堰
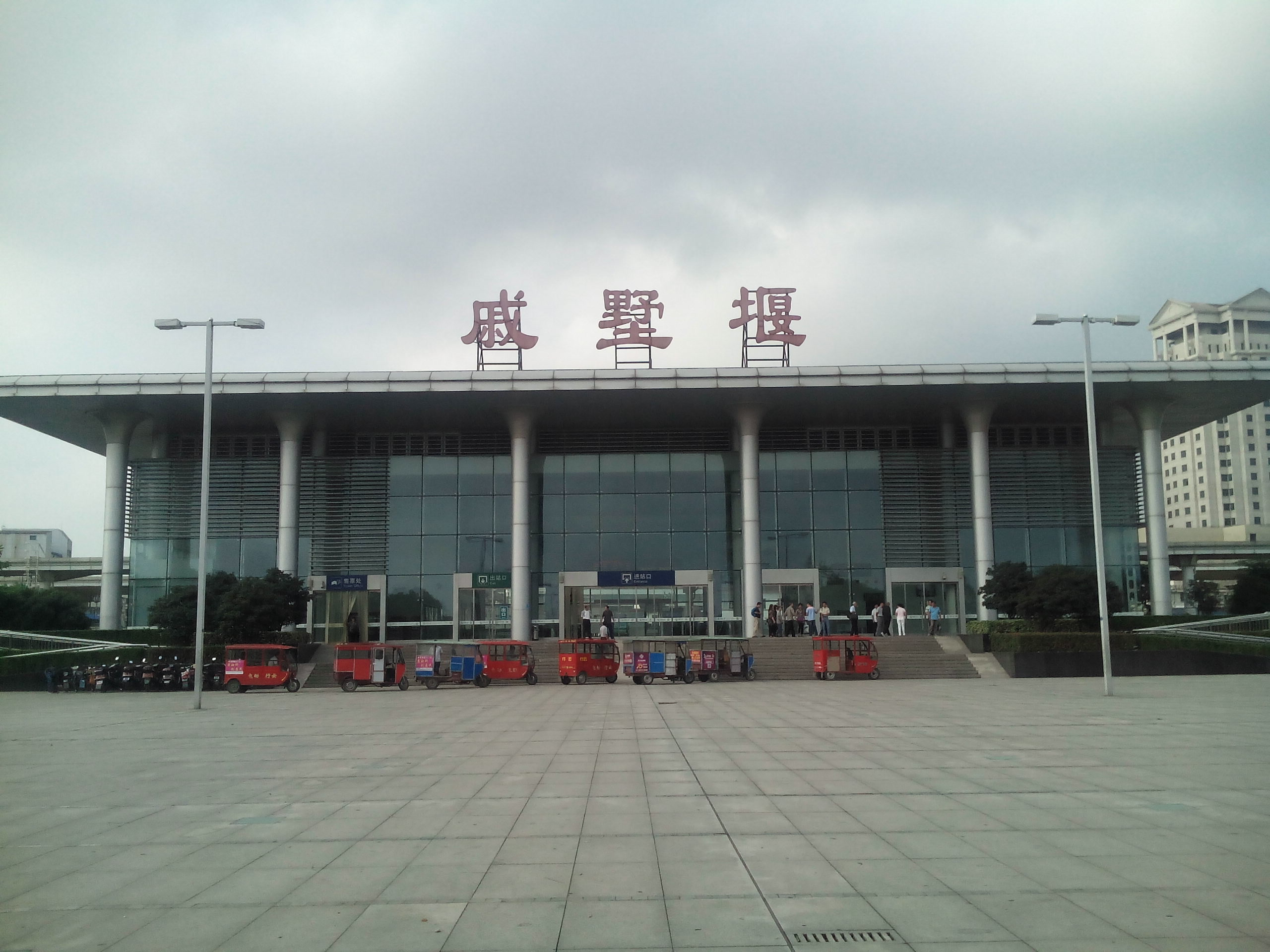

General information
- Location: Wujin District, Changzhou, Jiangsu; China
- Coordinates: 31°43′27.97″N 120°3′45.39″E
- Operator: Shanghai Railway Bureau, China Railway Corporation
- Lines: Beijing–Shanghai railway; Shanghai–Nanjing intercity railway

Other information
- Station code: TMIS code: 30479; Telegraph code: QYH; Pinyin code: QSY
- Classification: 3rd class station

History
- Opened: 1907
Location

Qishuyan railway station (Chinese: 戚墅堰站; pinyin: Qīshùyàn zhàn) is a railway station on the Beijing–Shanghai railway and Shanghai–Nanjing intercity railway. No passenger services on the Beijing–Shanghai railway currently stop at the station, but it is still used for freight. As of 2025, it handled 10 passenger trains per day on the Shanghai–Nanjing ICR. The station is located in Wujin District, Changzhou, Jiangsu, China.

== History ==
The station opened in 1907.

Preceding station	China Railway High-speed	Following station
Huishan towards Shanghai or Shanghai Hongqiao	Shanghai–Nanjing intercity railway Part of the Shanghai–Wuhan–Chengdu passenger-dedicated railway	Changzhou towards Nanjing
Preceding station	China Railway	Following station
Changzhou towards Beijing	Beijing–Shanghai railway	Wuxi North towards Shanghai
