= Wuxi Xinqu railway station =

Railway station in Wuxi, China

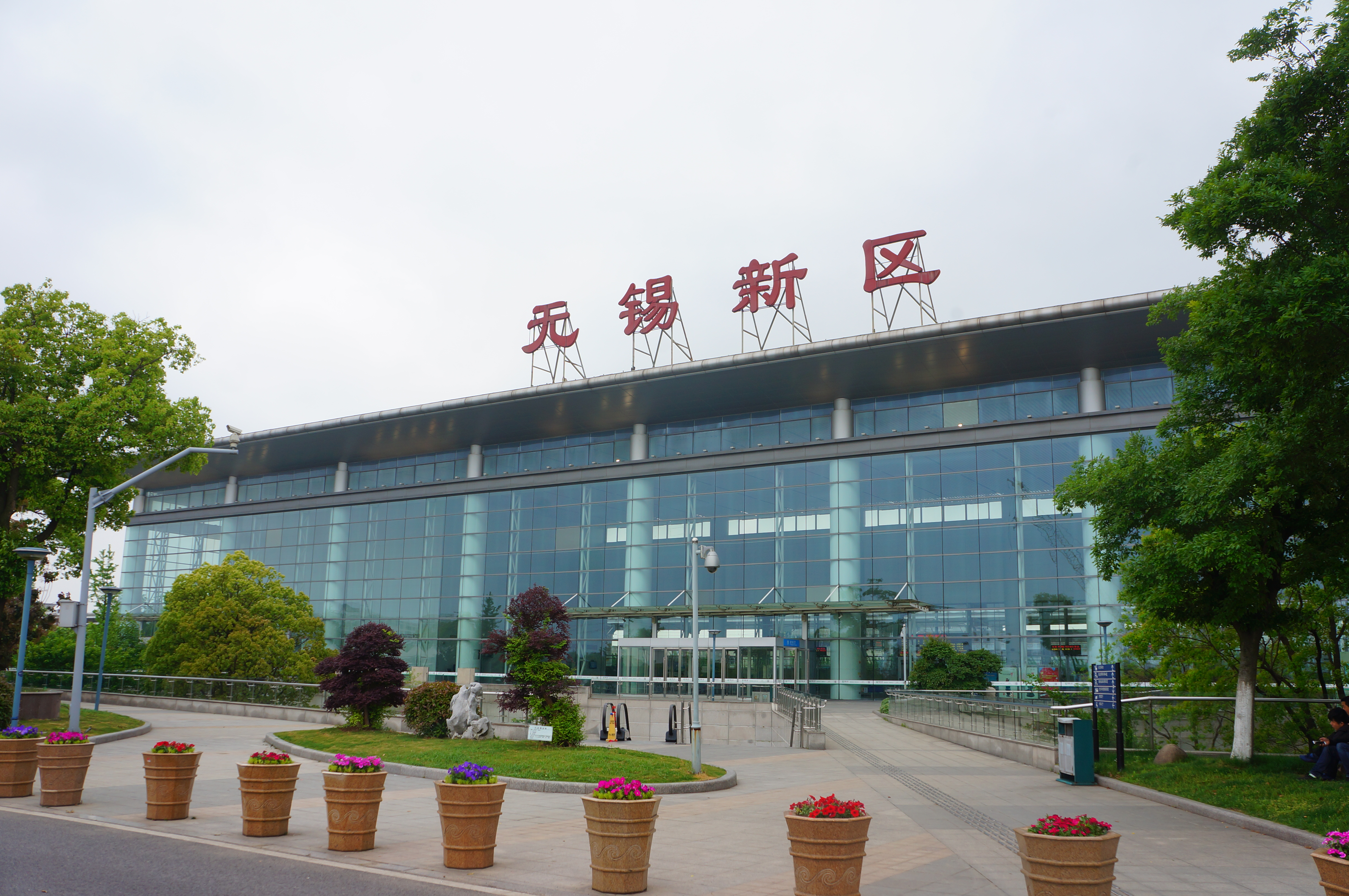
Station facade in 2017

Wuxi Xinqu station (Chinese: 无锡新区站; pinyin: Wúxī Xīnqū zhàn; lit. 'Wuxi New District railway station') is a railway station of Shanghai–Nanjing Intercity Railway located in Xinwu District (formerly Wuxi New District), Wuxi, Jiangsu, People's Republic of China. The station was built in 2008.

It is one of three railway stations serving Wuxi. Wuxi East railway station is a dedicated hub for high-speed rail, while Wuxi railway station is the main central station served by both high-speed and conventional trains. Wuxi Xinqu station is a secondary stop for high-speed rail service, with a limited number of Beijing–Shanghai high-speed trains stopping daily.

== Metro station ==
A station on the Line 3 of the Wuxi Metro opened in 2020.

Preceding station	China Railway High-speed	Following station
Suzhou Xinqu towards Shanghai or Shanghai Hongqiao	Shanghai–Nanjing intercity railway	Wuxi towards Nanjing
