= Huishan railway station =

Railway station in Wuxi, China

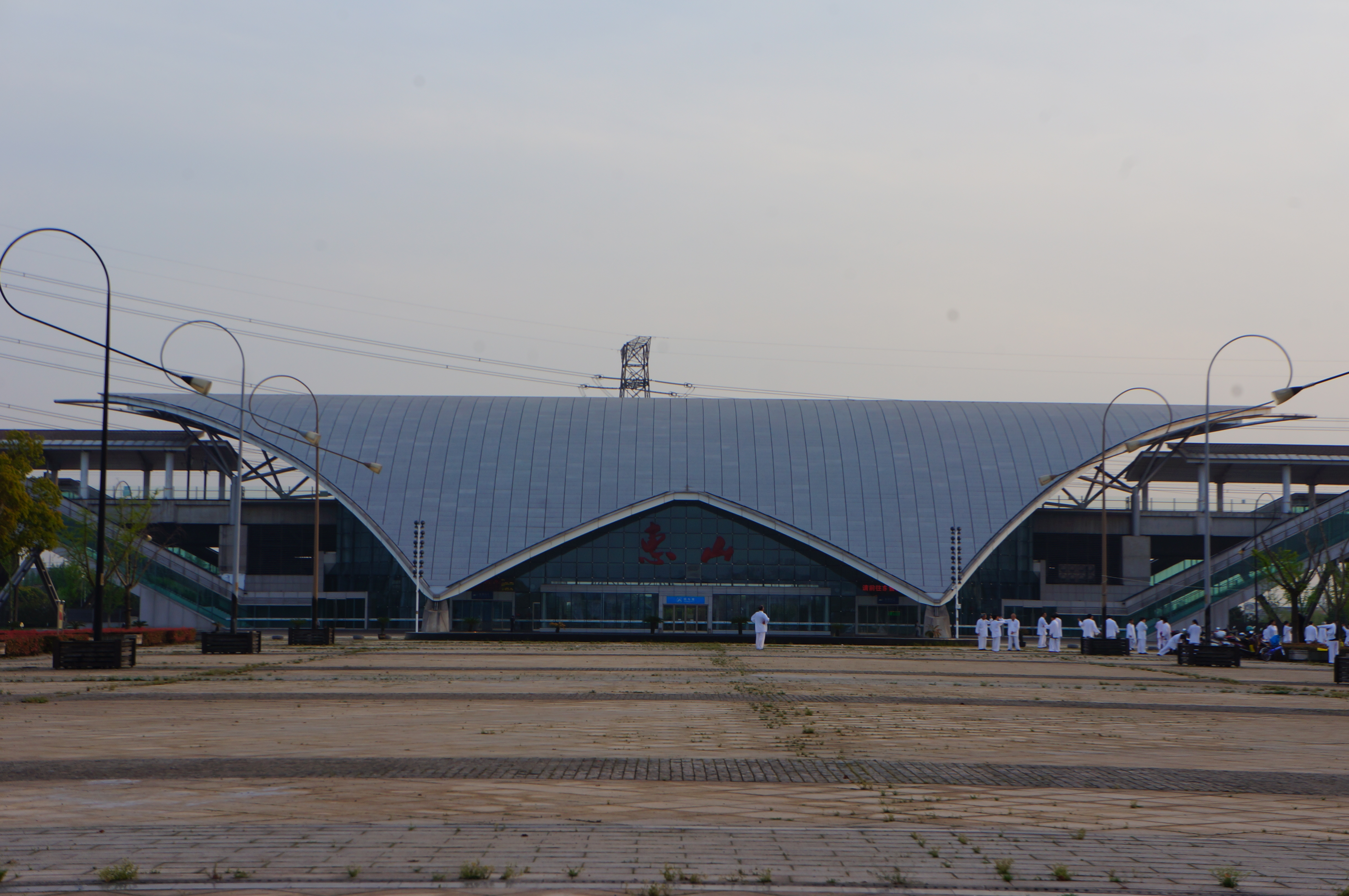
Facade of Huishan railway station

Huishan railway station is a railway station of Shanghai–Nanjing Intercity Railway located in Huishan District, Wuxi, Jiangsu, People's Republic of China. In the future, the Yancheng–Yixing intercity railway will pass through this station.

In the future, with the construction of the Yantaixichangyi intercity railway and the Suxichang express line, Huishan Station will usher in the renovation and expansion of the platform and station building.

Preceding station	China Railway High-speed	Following station
Wuxi towards Shanghai or Shanghai Hongqiao	Shanghai–Nanjing intercity railway Part of the Huhanrong Passenger Dedicated Line	Qishuyan towards Nanjing
