= Wuxi North railway station =

Railway station in Huishan, Wuxi, Jiangsu

Wuxi North 无锡北
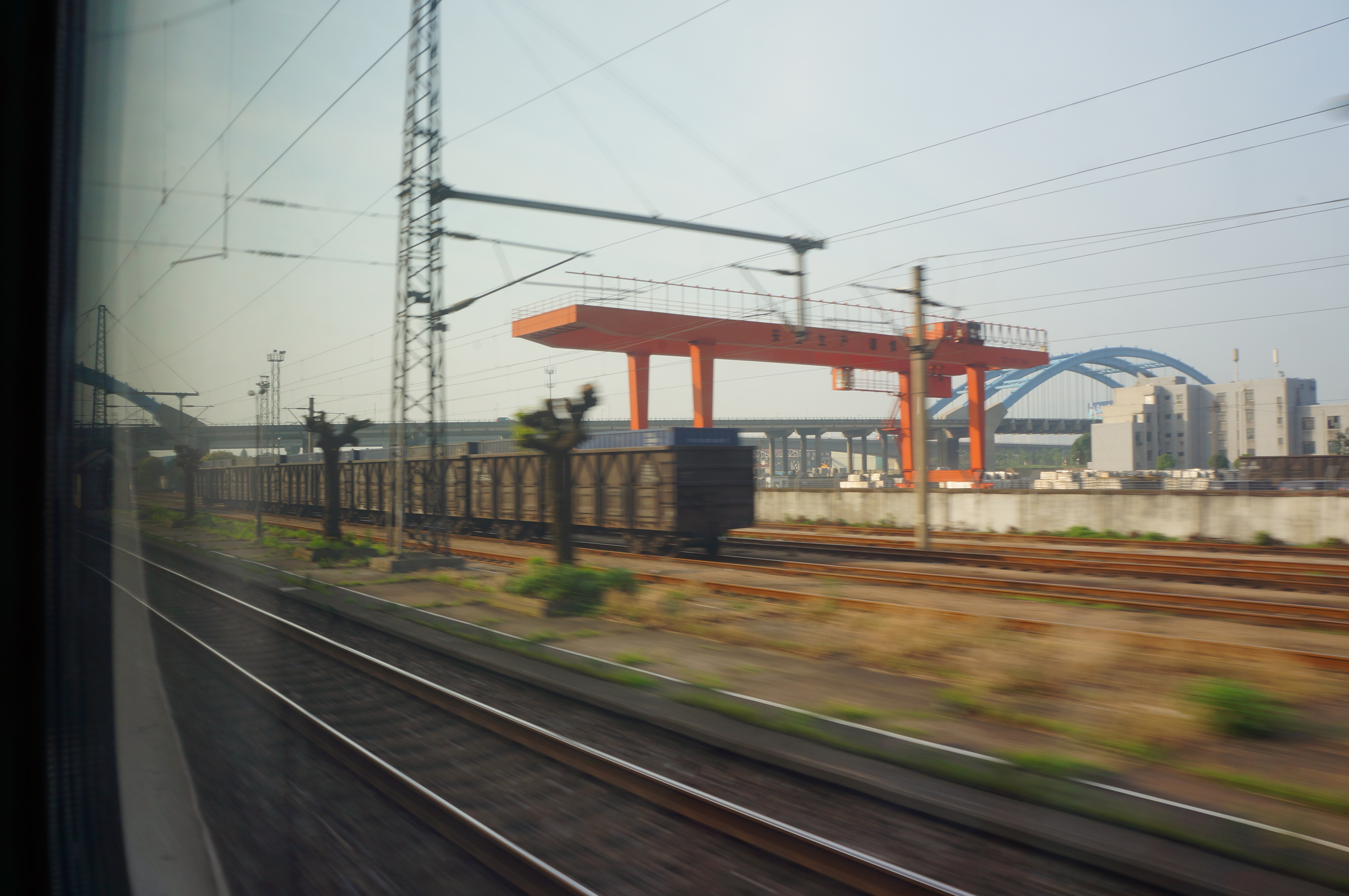

General information
- Location: Huishan District, Wuxi, Jiangsu; China
- Coordinates: 31.635163°N 120.243652°E
- Line(s): Beijing–Shanghai railway; Xinyi–Changxing railway (via spur)

History
- Opened: 1908

Wuxi North railway station (Chinese: 无锡北站) is a freight-handling railway station in Huishan District, Wuxi, Jiangsu, China. It is an intermediate stop on the Beijing–Shanghai railway and is also connected by a short stretch of track to the Xinyi–Changxing railway.

== History ==
The station opened in 1908. In 2003, the name of the station was changed from Shitangwan (Chinese: 石塘湾) to Wuxi North.
