= Jinghai station =

Wuxi Metro station

Coordinates: 31°35′07″N 120°19′32″E

Jinghai 靖海
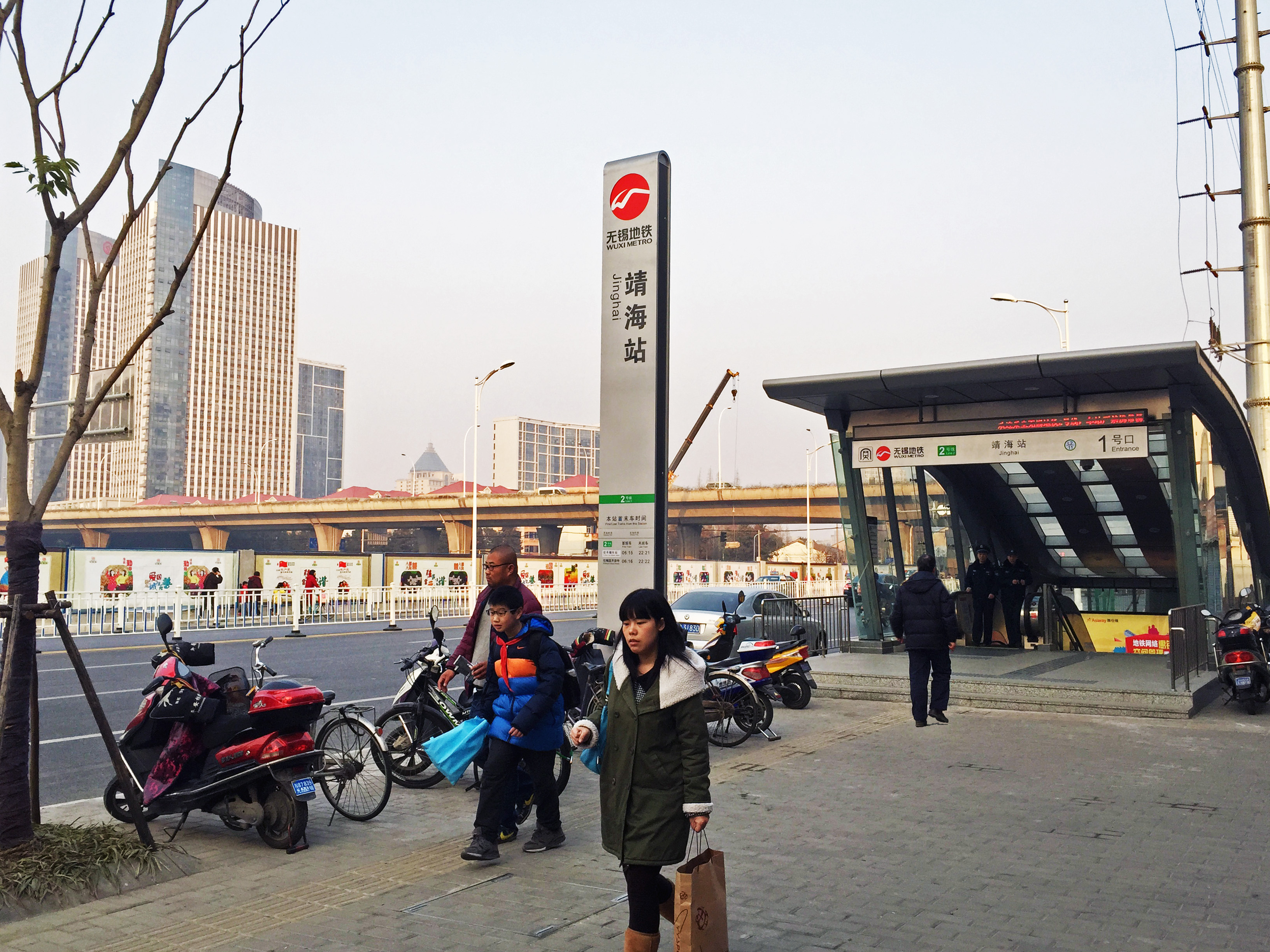
- Exit 1

General information
- Location: Chong'an District, Wuxi, Jiangsu; China
- Operator: Wuxi Metro Corporation
- Lines: Line 2; Line 3
- Platforms: 4 (2 island platforms)

Construction
- Structure type: Underground

History
- Opened: 28 December 2014

Services
Preceding station	Wuxi Metro	Following station
Shangmadun towards Meiyuan Kaiyuan Temple	Line 2	Guangyi towards Wuxi East Railway Station
Guangrui towards Sumiao	Line 3	Dongfeng towards Sunan Shuofang International Airport
Location

Jinghai Station (Chinese: 靖海站) is a metro station on Line 2 and Line 3 of the Wuxi Metro. It started operations on 28 December 2014.

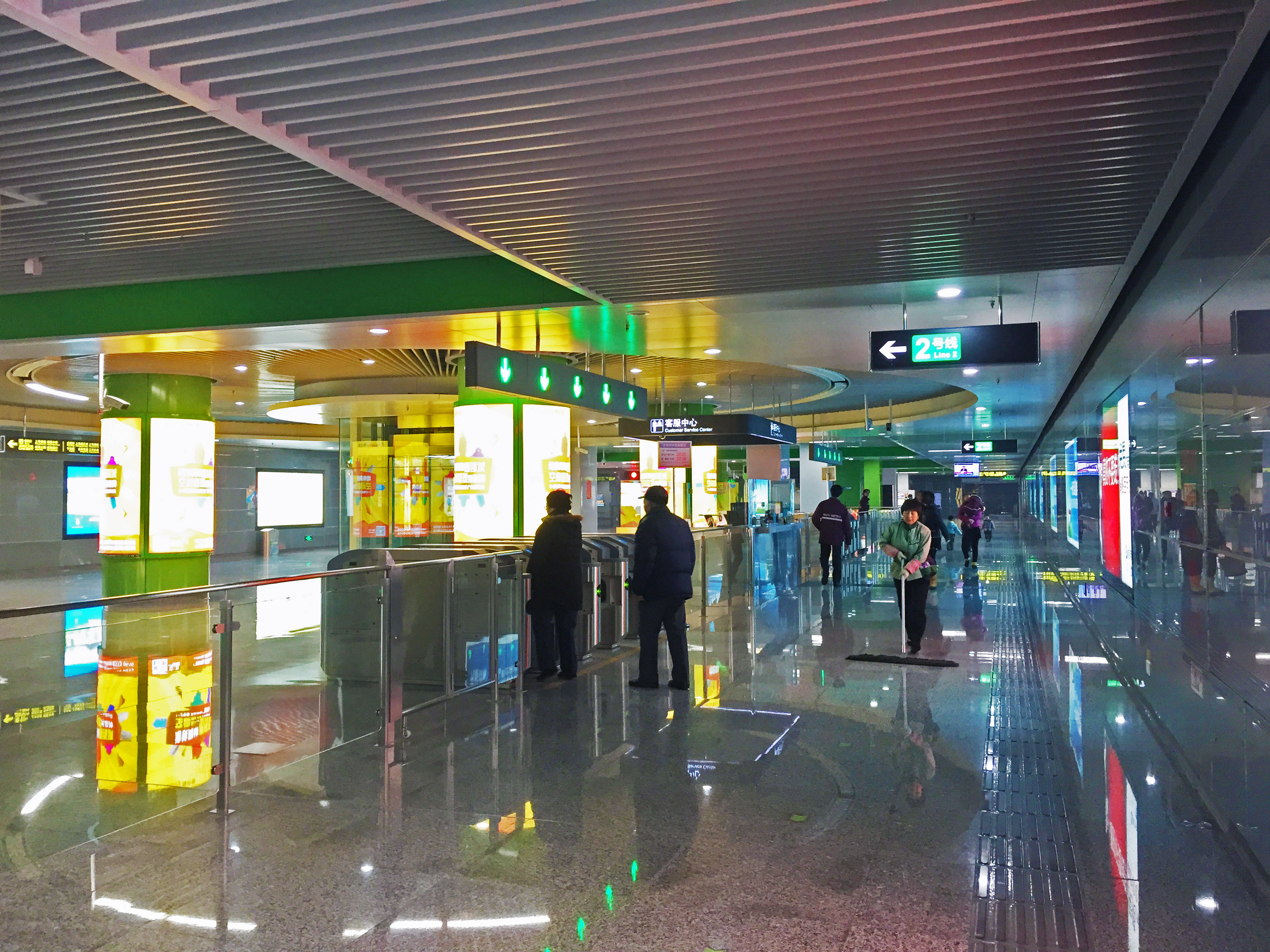
Station Hall

== Station layout ==
Ground
Ground	Exits

B1	Station Hall	Service Center, Ticket vending machine, Toilet, Elevator, Shops
B2	West	←█ towards Meiyuan Kaiyuan Temple
B2	Island Platform, doors will open on the left
B2	East	█ towards Anzhen→

B3	West	←█ towards Sumiao
B3	Island Platform, doors will open on the left
B3	East	█ towards Sunan Shuofang International Airport→

== Exits ==
There are 3 exits for this station.
