= Saint Joseph's Church, Wuxi =

- 无锡圣若瑟堂
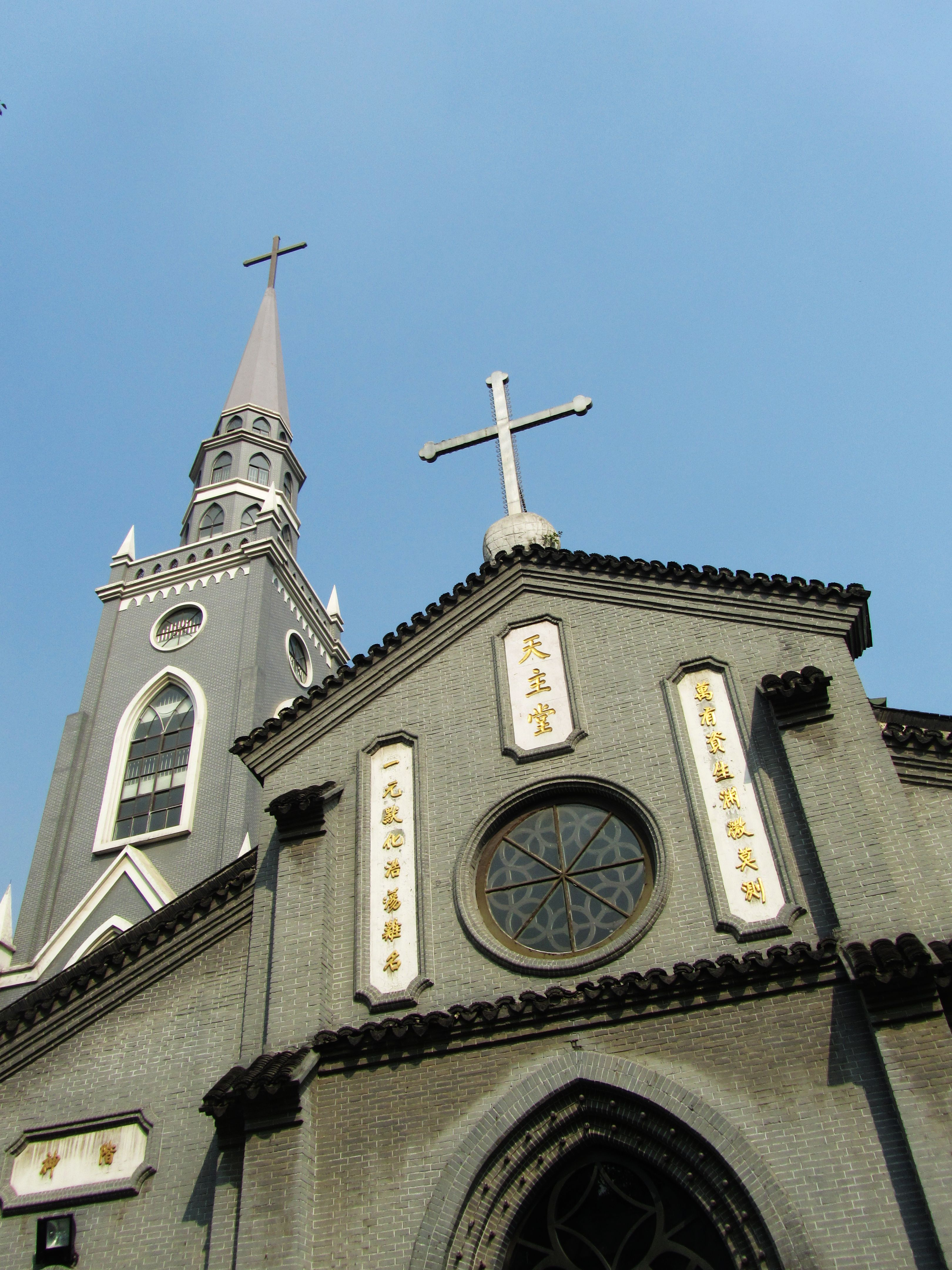
- Saint Joseph's Church, Wuxi in 2011

- Location in Jiangsu
- 31°35′23″N 120°17′11″E
- Location: Beitang District, Wuxi, Jiangsu, China
- Denomination: Roman Catholic

History
- Status: Parish church
- Founded: 1640

Architecture
- Functional status: Active
- Architectural type: Church building
- Completed: 1892 (reconstruction)

Specifications
- Materials: Granite

Chinese name
- Simplified Chinese: 无锡圣若瑟堂
- Traditional Chinese: 無錫聖若瑟堂
Transcriptions
Standard Mandarin
- Hanyu Pinyin: Wúxī Shèngruòsè Táng

Saint Joseph's Church, Sanliqiao
- Simplified Chinese: 三里桥圣若瑟堂
- Traditional Chinese: 三里橋聖若瑟堂
Transcriptions
Standard Mandarin
- Hanyu Pinyin: Sānlǐqiáo Shèngruòsè Táng

The Saint Joseph's Church, Wuxi (Chinese: 无锡圣若瑟堂), locally known as Saint Joseph's Church, Sanliqiao, is a Roman Catholic church located in Beitang District of Wuxi, Jiangsu, China.

== History ==
The original church dates back to 1640, in the late Ming dynasty (1368–1644).

The church became dilapidated for neglect after the Chinese Rites controversy during the ruling of Yongzheng Emperor (1722–1735) of the Qing dynasty (1644–1911). In 1853, French missionaries Staislas Clavelin (葛必达) and Murice Sentinier (桑理爵) refurbished and redecorated the church when they came to Wuxi to preach. Soon after, it was devastated by the Taiping Rebellion (1850–1864). Murice Sentinier restored the church again in 1864. In 1872, Adrien Languillat built a new building for the church. In 1891, a disastrous fire consumed the new church. And it was rebuilt by missionary Albert Tschepe (彭安多) in 1892.

In 1966, the Cultural Revolution broke out, the bell tower was removed and the church was used as warehouse. It was officially reopened to the public on 25 December 1980. The church was inscribed as a municipal cultural relic preservation organ in 1994 and a provincial cultural relic preservation organ in 2006, respectively. On 20 March 2006, a 62-metre (203 ft) high bell tower was put into use.

== Gallery ==
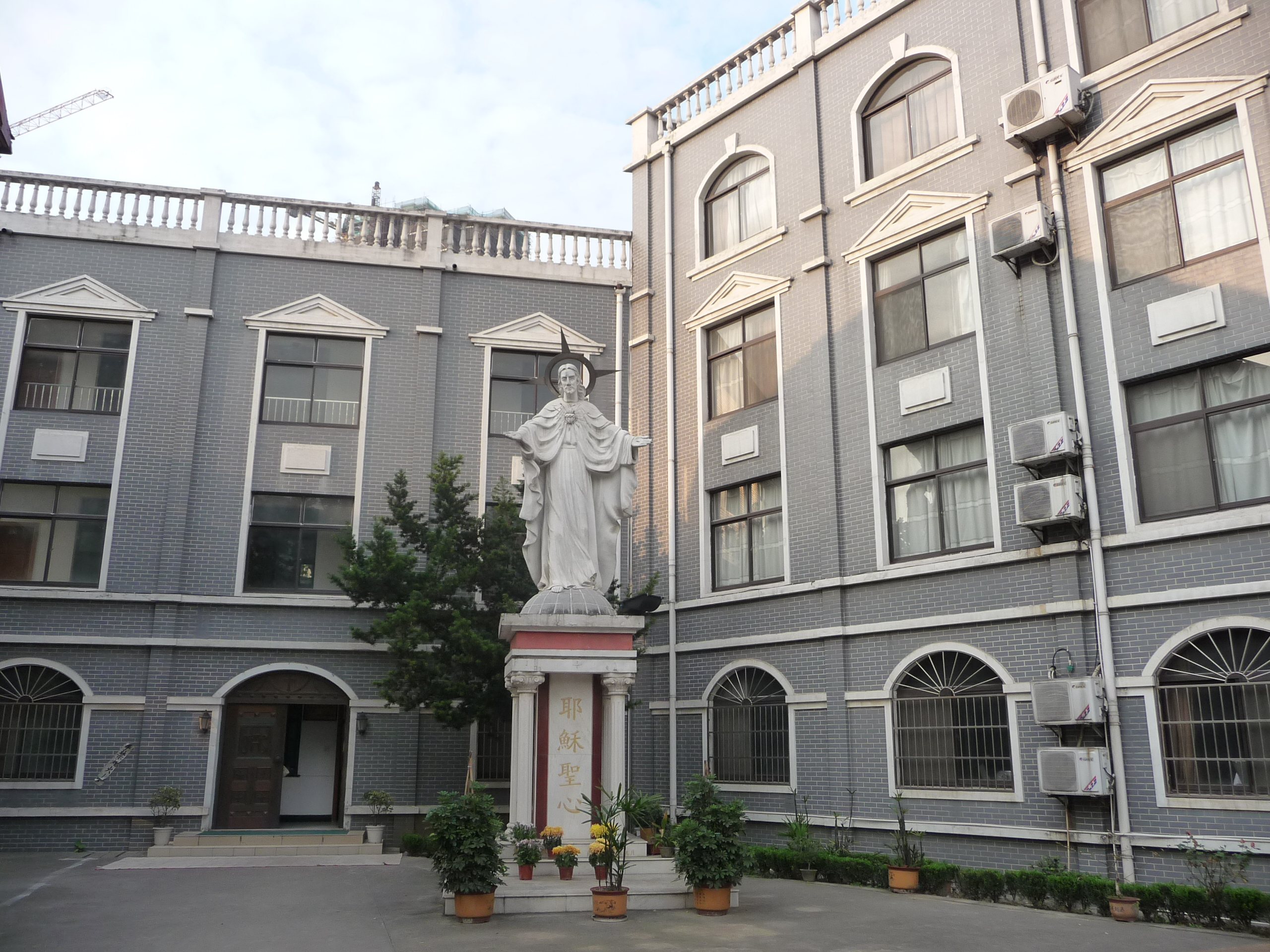
Statue of Sacred Heart of Jesus

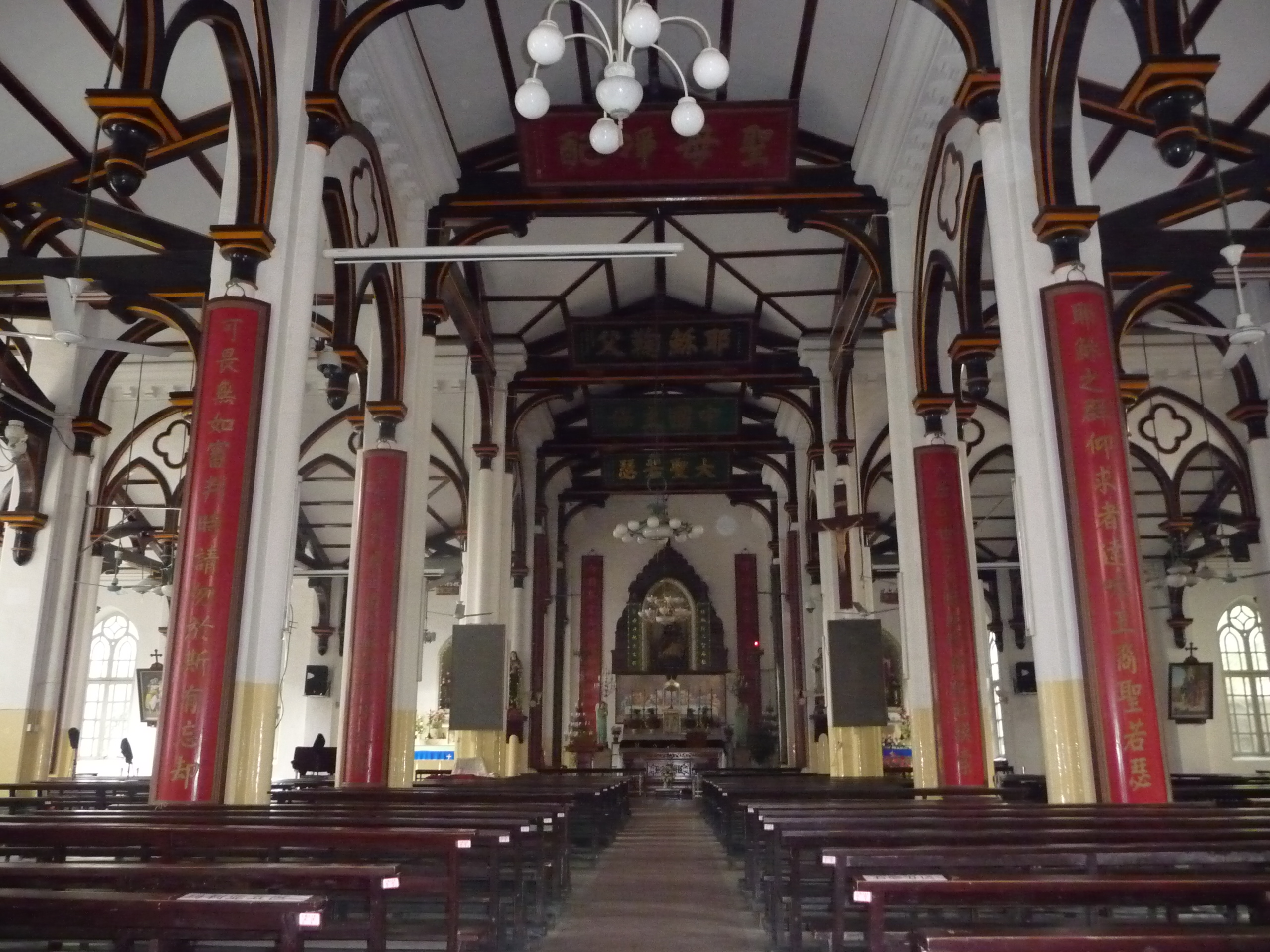
Interior of the church

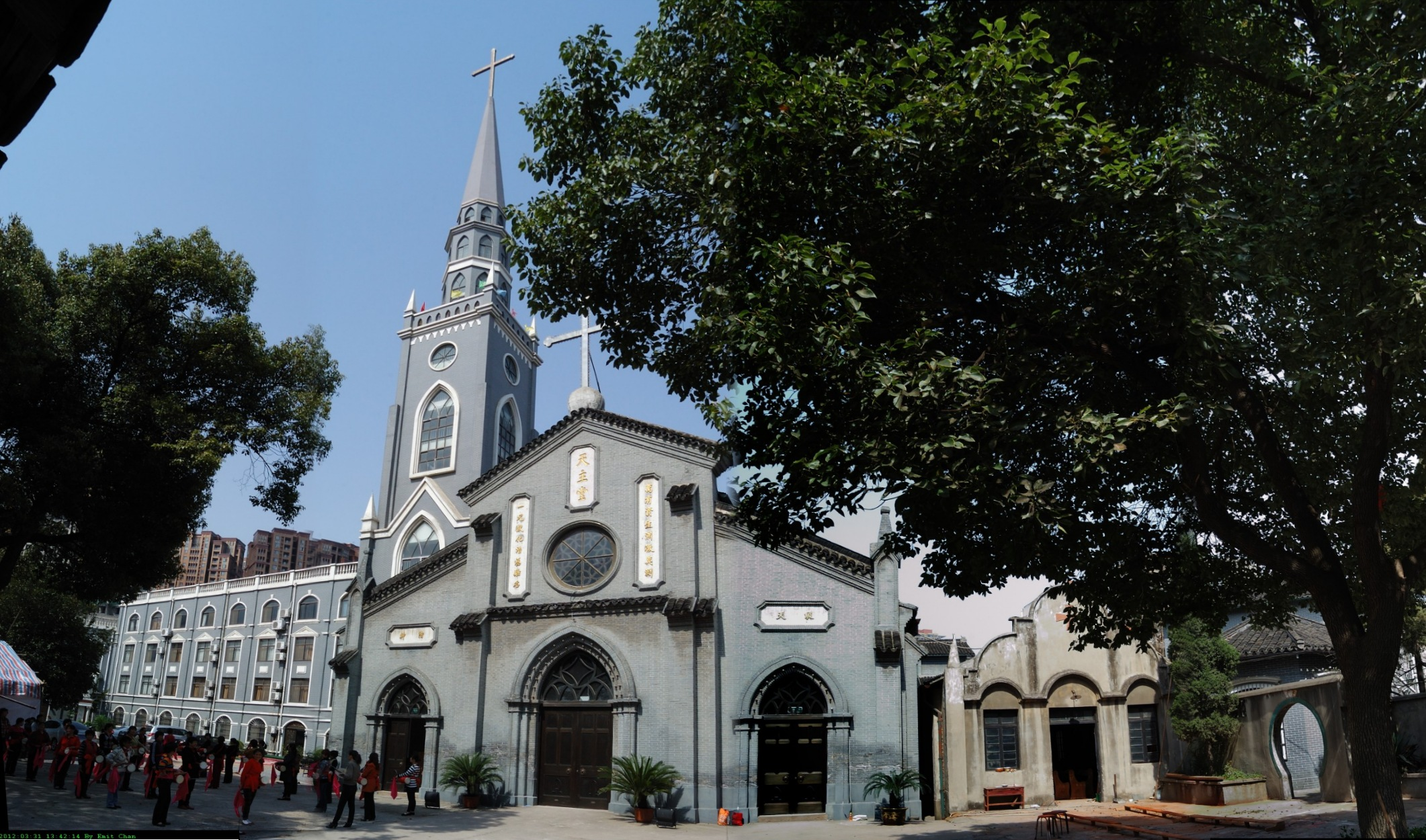
Frontal view of the church
