= Beitang =

Beitang may refer to the following locations in China:

- Beitang District (北塘区), Wuxi, Jiangsu
- Beitang Subdistrict (北塘街道), Binhai, Tianjin
- Beitang Church, or Xishiku Cathedral, in Xicheng District, Beijing
