= Sanyang Plaza station =

Wuxi Metro station

Sanyang Plaza 三阳广场
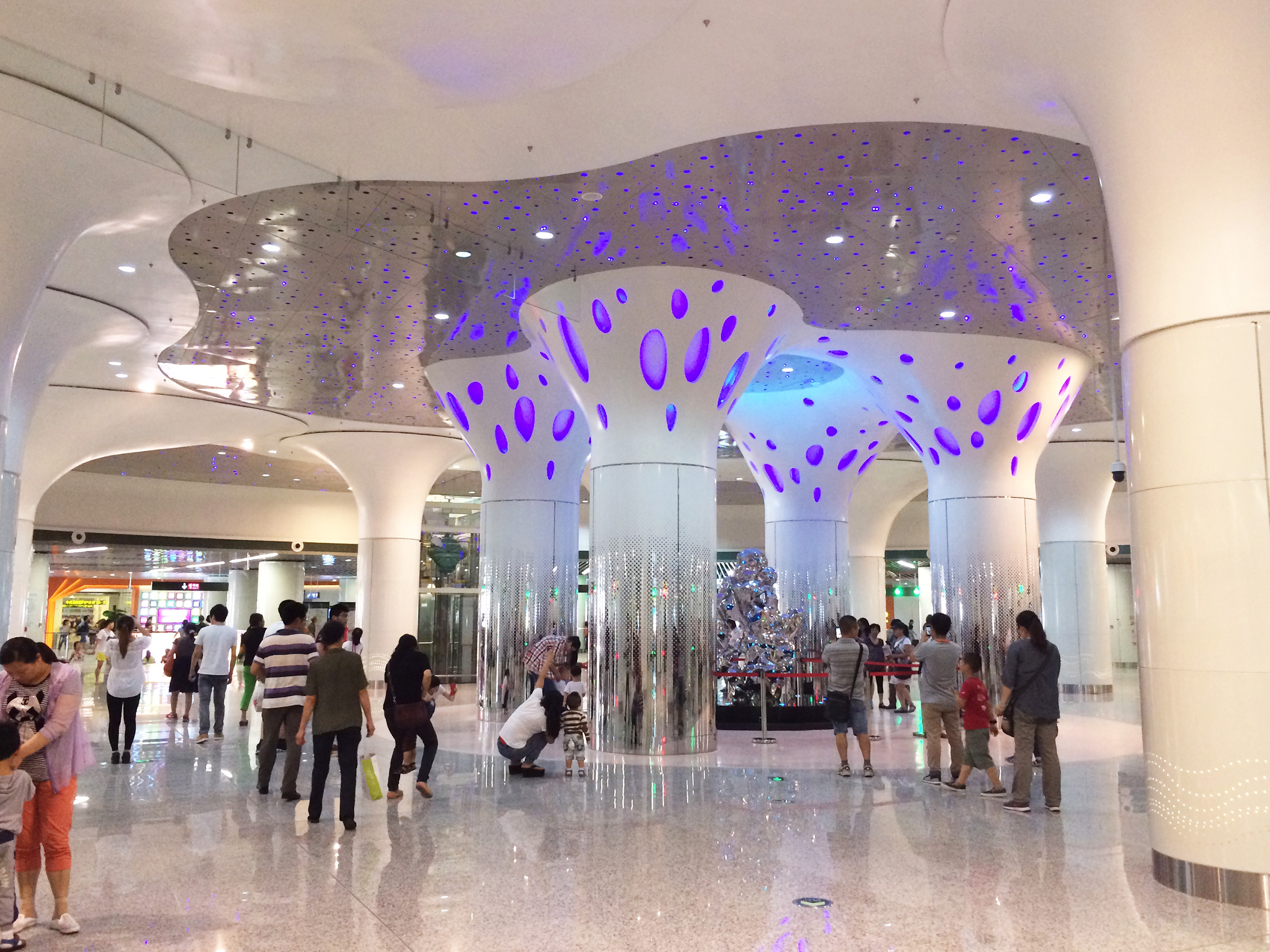
- Station hall

General information
- Location: Chong'an District, Wuxi, Jiangsu; China
- Coordinates: 31°34′39″N 120°17′43″E
- Operator: Wuxi Metro Corporation
- Lines: Line 1; Line 2
- Platforms: 4 (1 island platform 1 side platform)

Construction
- Structure type: Underground

History
- Opened: 1 July 2014; 12 years ago (Line 1); 28 December 2014; 11 years ago (Line 2)

Services
Preceding station	Wuxi Metro	Following station
Shenglimen towards Yanqiao	Line 1	Nanchan Temple towards Nanfangquan
Wu'ai Plaza towards Meiyuan Kaiyuan Temple	Line 2	Donglin Plaza towards Wuxi East Railway Station
Location

Sanyang Plaza station (Chinese: 三阳广场站) is an interchange station of Line 1 and Line 2 of the Wuxi Metro. It opened for operations on 1 July 2014. It is the largest metro station in China. It is also the largest metro in both East China and the entire China by number of exits/entrances (currently, this station has 27 exits/entrances, future expanded to 29).

== Station layout ==
Ground
Ground	Exits

B1	Station hall	Service Center, Ticket vending machine, Toilet, Elevator
B2
B2	Side Platform, doors will open on the right ↓Escalator (To B3 █ Line 1 platform)
B2	West	←█ towards Meiyuan Kaiyuan Temple
B2	East	█ towards Wuxi East Railway Station and Anzhen→
B2	Side Platform, doors will open on the right ↓Escalator (To B3 █ Line 1 platform)

B3	North	←█ towards Yanqiao
B3	Island Platform, doors will open on the left ↑Escalator (To B2 █ Line 2 platform)
B3	South	█ towards Nanfangquan→

== Exits ==
There are 27 exits for this station.

== Gallery ==
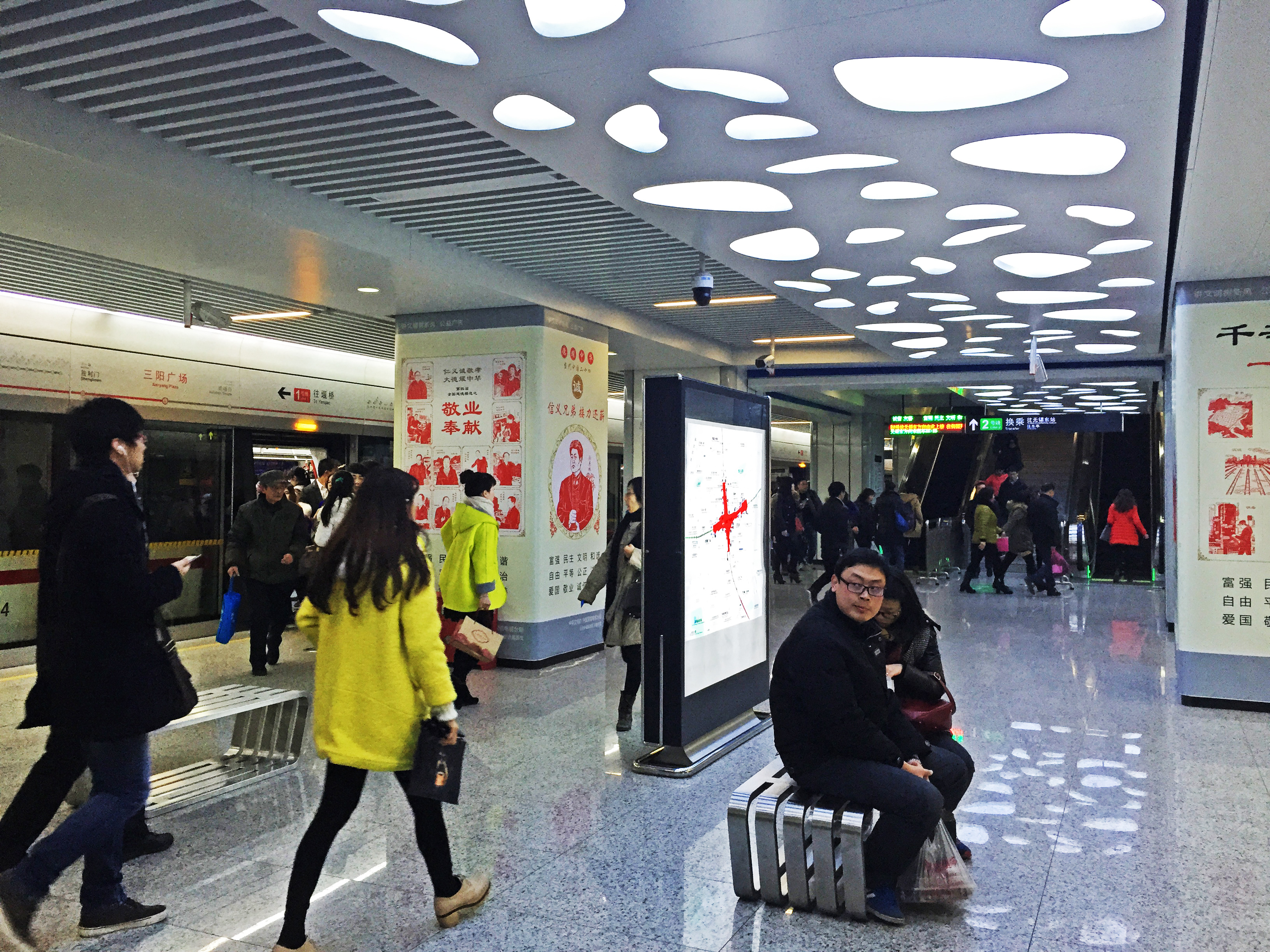
Platform of Line 1

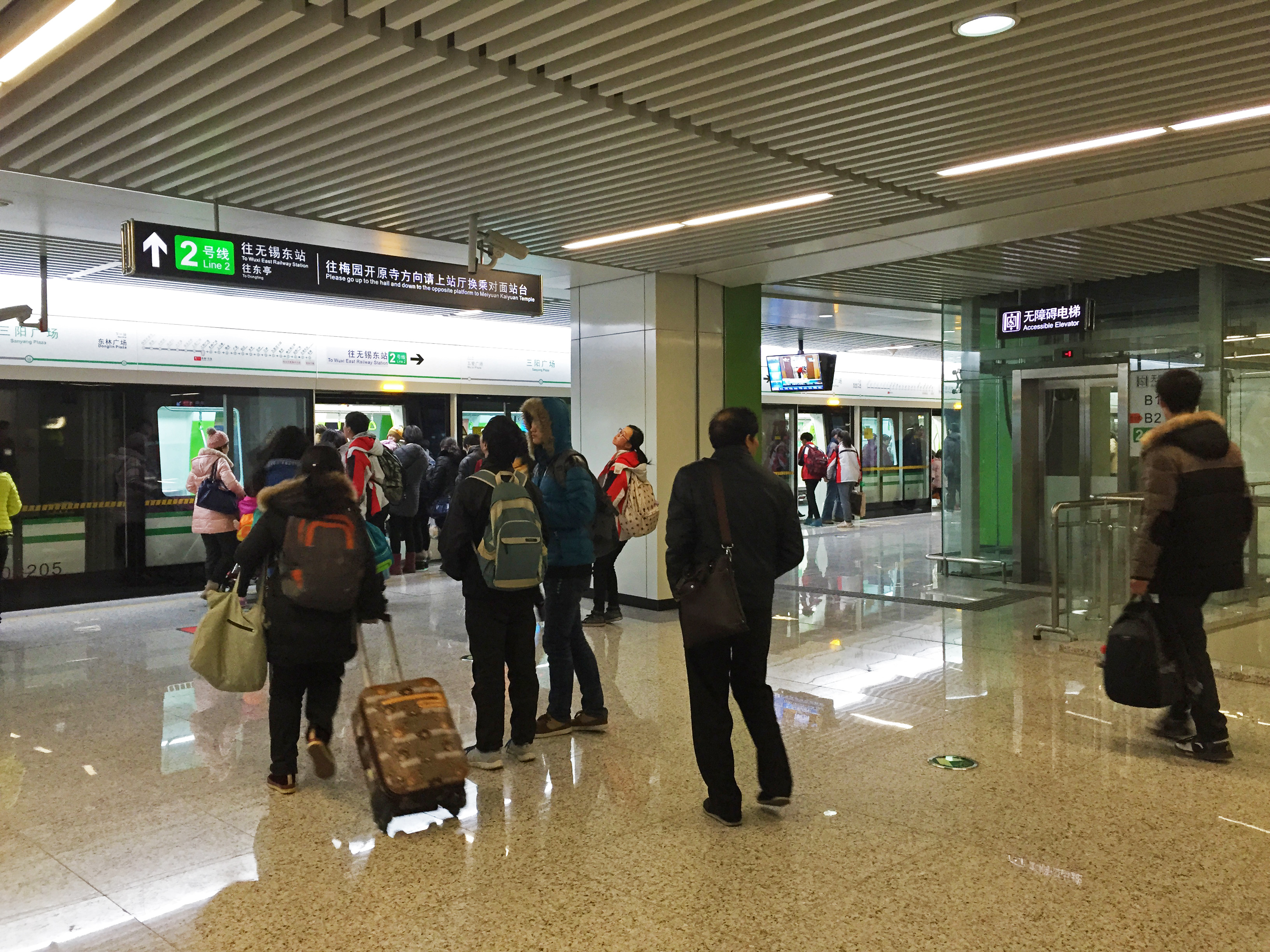
Platform of Line 2 (towards Wuxi East Railway Station)

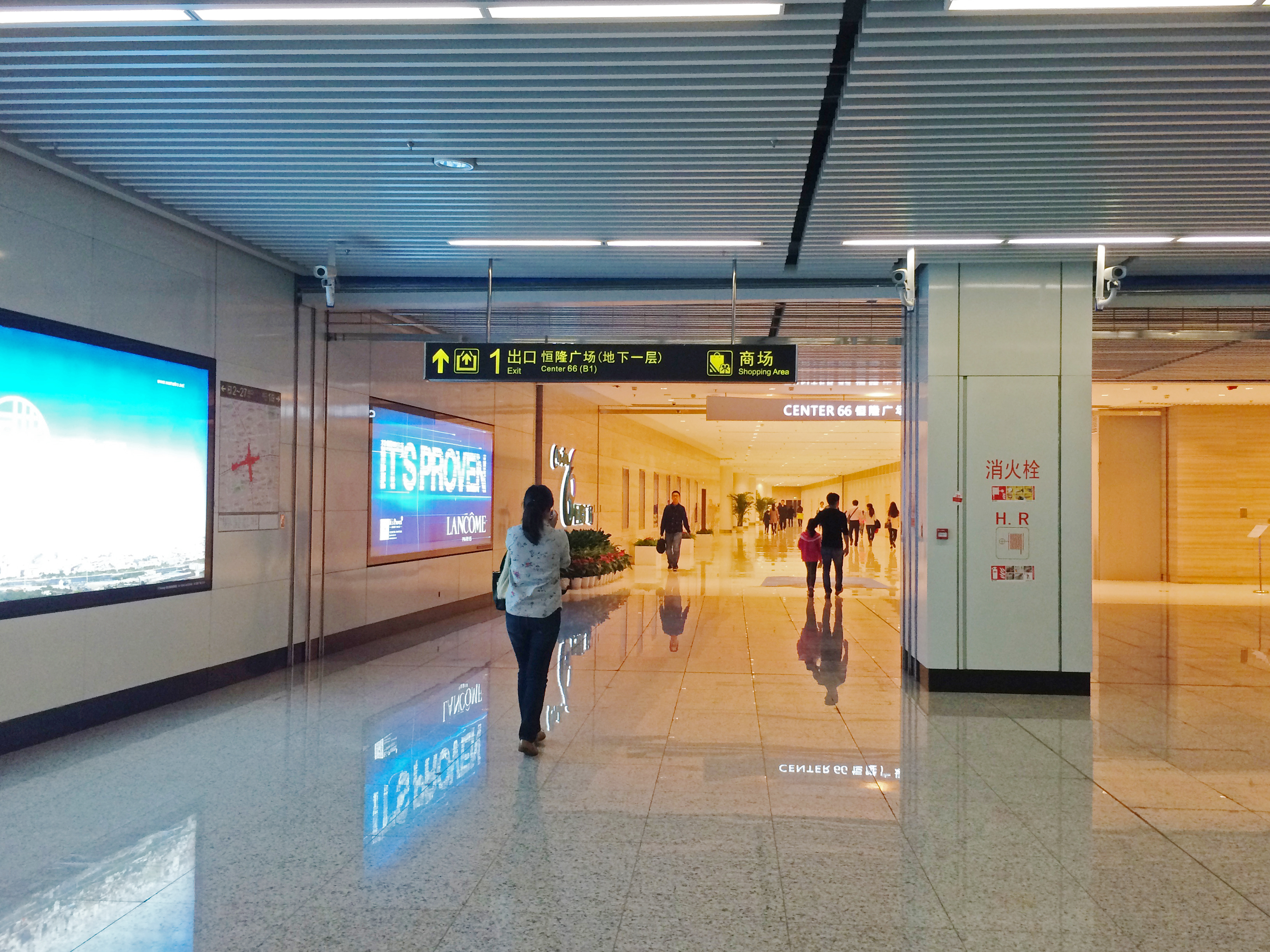
Exit 1

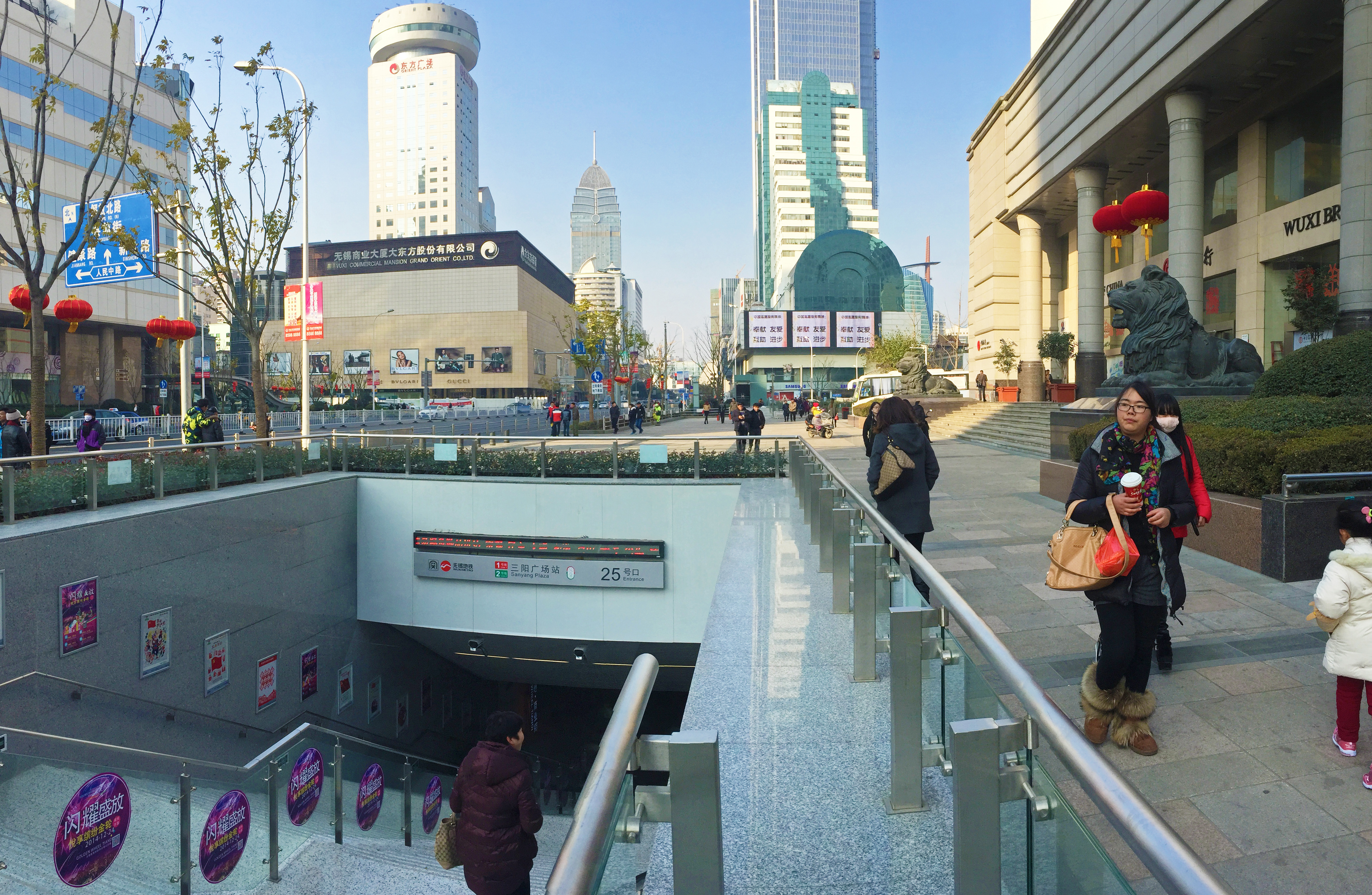
Exit 25

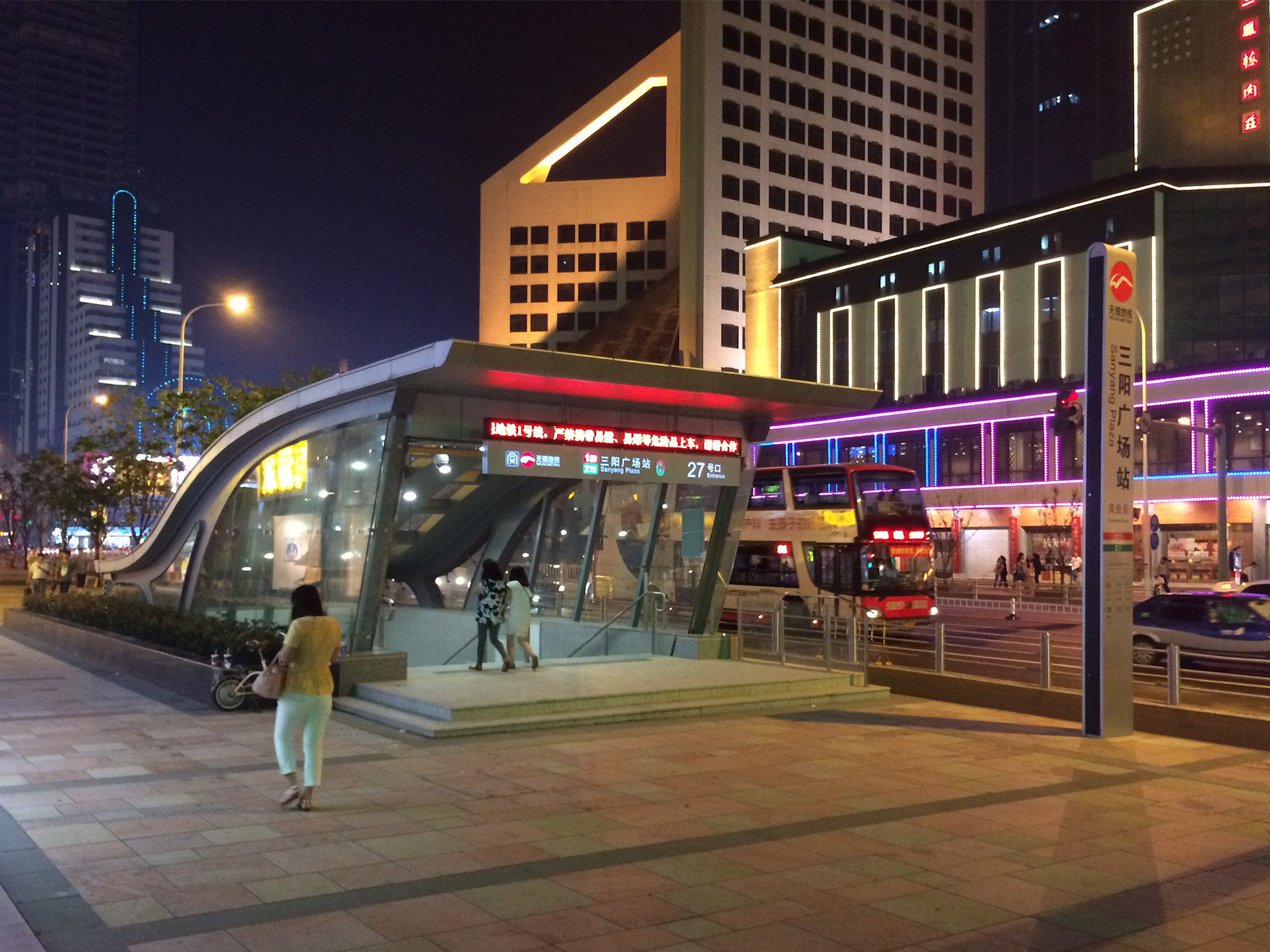
Exit 27
