= Qingmingqiao station =

Wuxi Metro station

Coordinates: 31°33′05″N 120°18′24″E

Qingmingqiao 清名桥
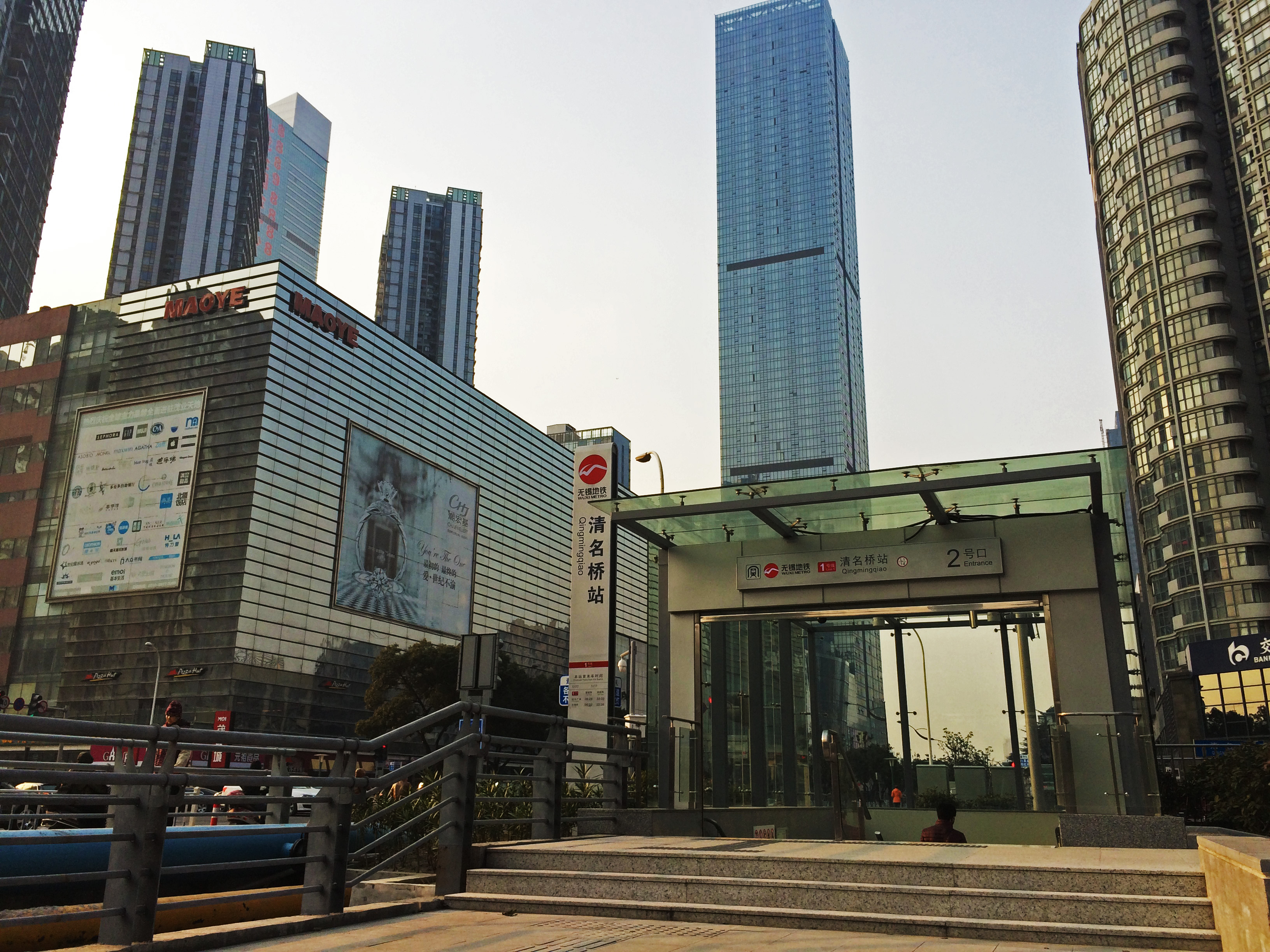
- Exit 2

General information
- Location: Nanchang District, Wuxi, Jiangsu; China
- Operated by: Wuxi Metro Corporation
- Line: Line 1
- Platforms: 2 (1 island platform)

Construction
- Structure type: Underground

History
- Opened: 1 July 2014

Services
Preceding station	Wuxi Metro	Following station
Taihu Square towards Yanqiao	Line 1	People's Hospital towards Nanfangquan
Location

Qingmingqiao Station (Chinese: 清名桥站) is a metro station of Line 1 of the Wuxi Metro. It started operations on 1 July 2014.

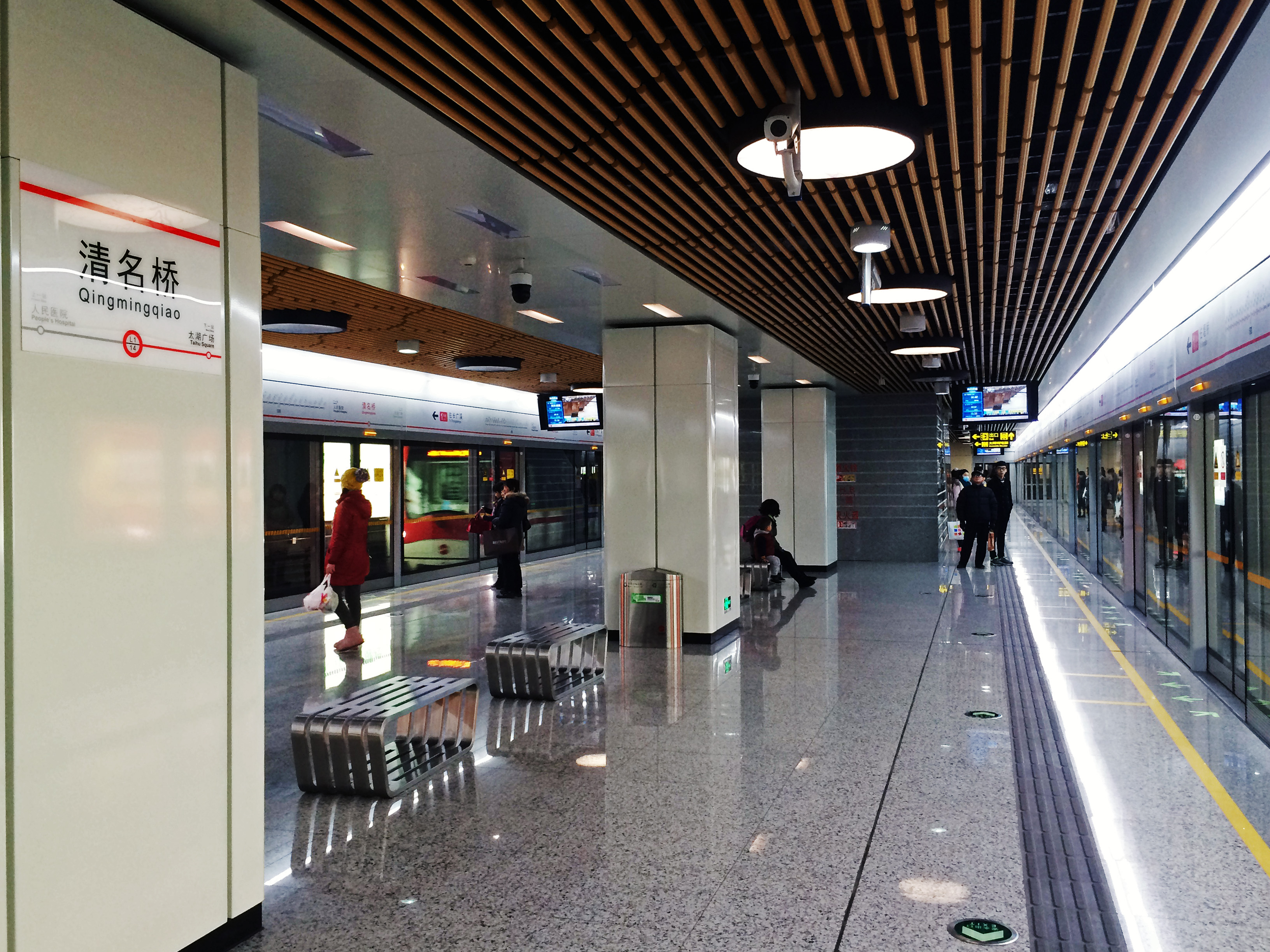
Platform

== Station layout ==
Ground
Ground	Exits

B1	Station Hall	Service Center, Ticket vending machine, Toilet, Elevator, Shops
B2	North	←█ towards Yanqiao
B2	Island Platform, doors will open on the left
B2	South	█ towards Nanfangquan→

== Exits ==
There are 5 exits for this station.
