= People's Hospital station =

People's Hospital station may refer to:

- People's Hospital station (Shaoxing Metro)
- People's Hospital station (Wuxi Metro)
