= Line 3 (Wuxi Metro) =

Metro line in Wuxi, China

Overview
- Status: Operational
- Owner: Wuxi Government
- Locale: Wuxi, Jiangsu, China
- Termini: Sumiao; Sunan Shuofang International Airport
- Stations: 21

Service
- Type: Rapid transit
- System: Wuxi Metro
- Services: 1
- Operator(s): Wuxi Metro Corporation

History
- Opened: October 28, 2020; 5 years ago

Technical
- Line length: 28.8 km (17.90 mi)
- Number of tracks: 2
- Track gauge: 1,435 mm (4 ft 8 1/2 in)
- Electrification: 1,500 V DC third rail
Route map
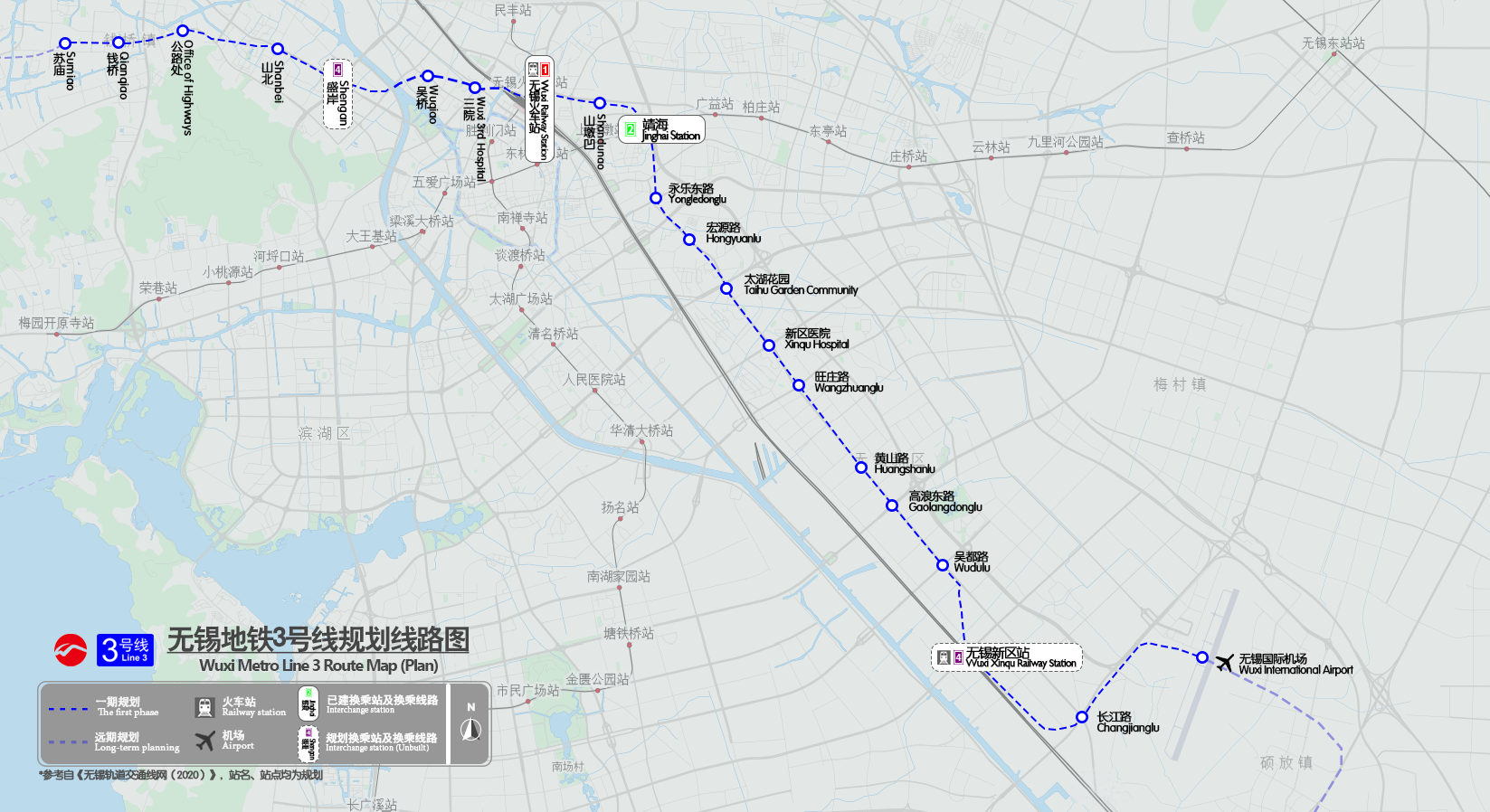

Line 3 of the Wuxi Metro is a rapid transit line in Wuxi, China. It was opened on 28 October 2020. The line is 28.5 km long with 21 stations.

== Opening timeline ==
Segment	Commencement	Length	Station(s)	Name
Sumiao — Sunan Shuofang International Airport	28 October 2020	28.5 km (17.71 mi)	21	Phase 1

== Stations (north to south) ==
Station №	Station name		Connections	Distance km	Location
Station №	English	Chinese	Connections	Distance km	Location
L321	Sumiao	苏庙			Huishan
L320	Qianqiao	钱桥			Huishan
L319	Longshanshao	龙山梢			Huishan
L318	Shimen Road	石门路			Liangxi
L317	Sheng'an	盛岸	4		Liangxi
L316	Wuqiao	吴桥			Liangxi
L315	Beizhakou	北栅口			Liangxi
L314	Wuxi Railway Station	无锡火车站	1 WXH		Liangxi
L313	Guangrui	广瑞			Liangxi
L312	Jinghai	靖海	2		Liangxi
L311	Dongfeng	东风			Liangxi / Xinwu
L310	Xufeng	叙丰			Xinwu
L309	Taihu Huayuan	太湖花园			Xinwu
L308	Xinguang Road	新光路			Xinwu
L307	Wangzhuang Road	旺庄路			Xinwu
L306	Huangshan Road	黄山路			Xinwu
L305	East Gaolang Road	高浪东路			Xinwu
L304	Zhoujingxiang	周泾巷			Xinwu
L303	Wuxi New District Station	无锡新区站	WXQ		Xinwu
L302	South Changjiang Road	长江南路			Xinwu
L301	Sunan Shuofang International Airport	硕放机场	WUX		Xinwu
