= Wuxi Big Bridge Experimental High School =

High school in Jiangsu Province, China

Coordinates: 31.474°N 120.37256°E

- Chinese: 无锡市大桥实验中学

Location
- 38 Xueqian Street; Liangxi, Wuxi, Jiangsu; China

Information
- School type: Private school
- Established: 1993; 33 years ago
- Grades: 1-12
- Gender: Mixed
- Enrollment: 2,786 (2013-2014)
- Website: www.daqiao.org.cn

Wuxi Big Bridge Experimental High School (Wuxi Big Bridge Academy) (Chinese: 无锡市大桥实验中学; pinyin: wú xī dà qiáo shí yàn zhōng xué), founded in 1993, is a private high school located in the downtown historical Xueqianjie neighbourhood of Wuxi, Jiangsu Province, China.

== School structure ==
The school is coeducational and serves students in grades 1-12.

The school serves as an independent magnet school for selected students from the Wuxi region. The academic goal of the school is to provide selected students with a specialised education that emphasises the acquisition of knowledge and talent development.

Wuxi Big Bridge Experimental High School offers students opportunities to study at Hwa Chong Institution, Singapore, after they finish 3 years of study.

== Alumni ==
Graduates have attended universities in the nation and around the world, which include, among many others, Qinghua, Peking, Fudan, and Nanjing in China, and Harvard, MIT, Cambridge, Oxford, and Amsterdam University College overseas.

== See also ==
- Education in China
