= People's Hospital station (Wuxi Metro) =

Wuxi Metro station

Coordinates: 31°32′38″N 120°18′53″E

People's Hospital 人民医院
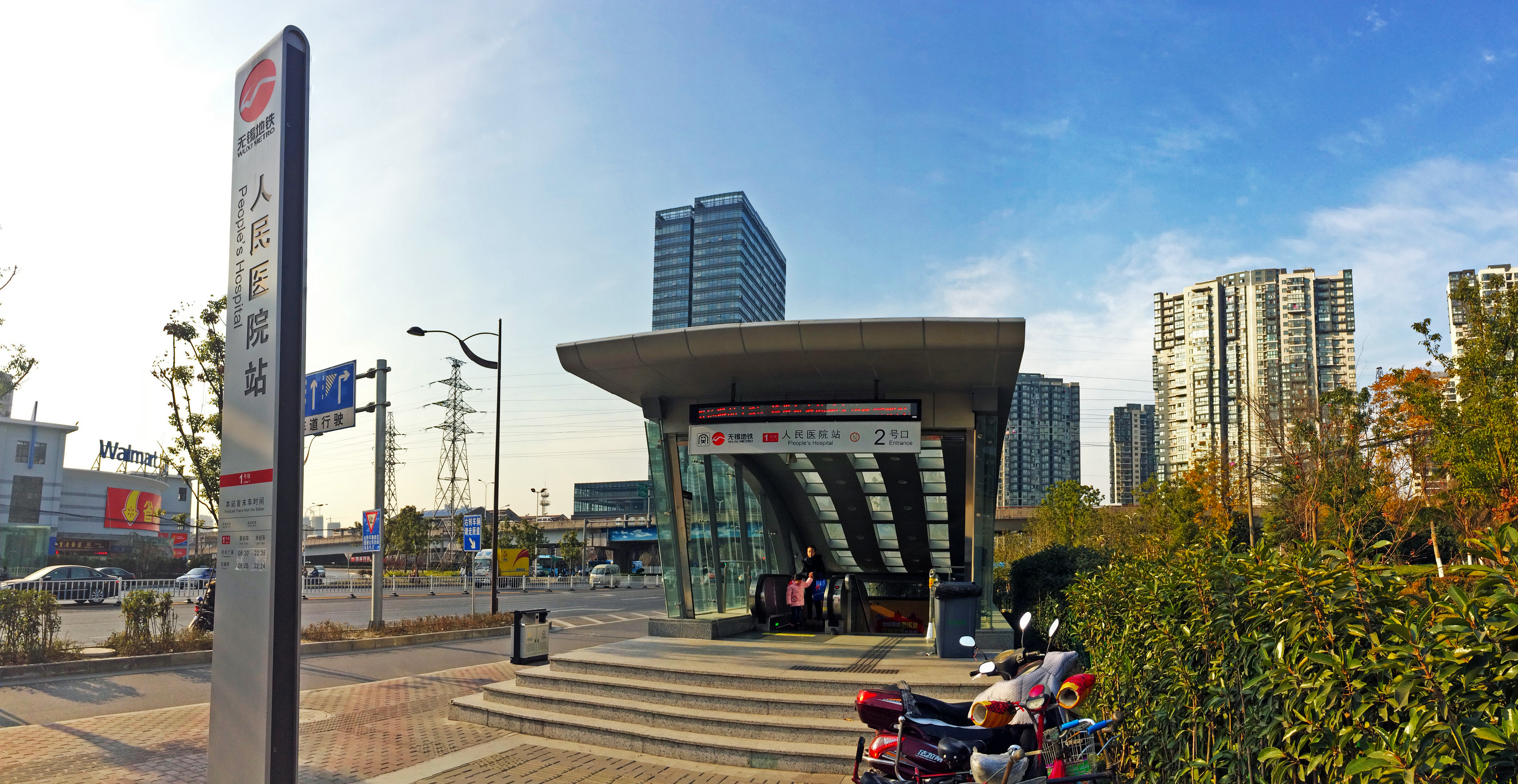
- Exit 2

General information
- Location: Nanchang District, Wuxi, Jiangsu; China
- Operator: Wuxi Metro Corporation
- Lines: Line 1; Line 5 (under construction)
- Platforms: 2 (1 island platform)

Construction
- Structure type: Underground

History
- Opened: 1 July 2014

Services
Preceding station	Wuxi Metro	Following station
Qingmingqiao towards Yanqiao	Line 1	Huaqingdaqiao towards Nanfangquan
Location

People's Hospital Station (Chinese: 人民医院站) is a metro station of Line 1, Wuxi Metro. It started operations on 1 July 2014. This station will become a future interchange station with Line 5.

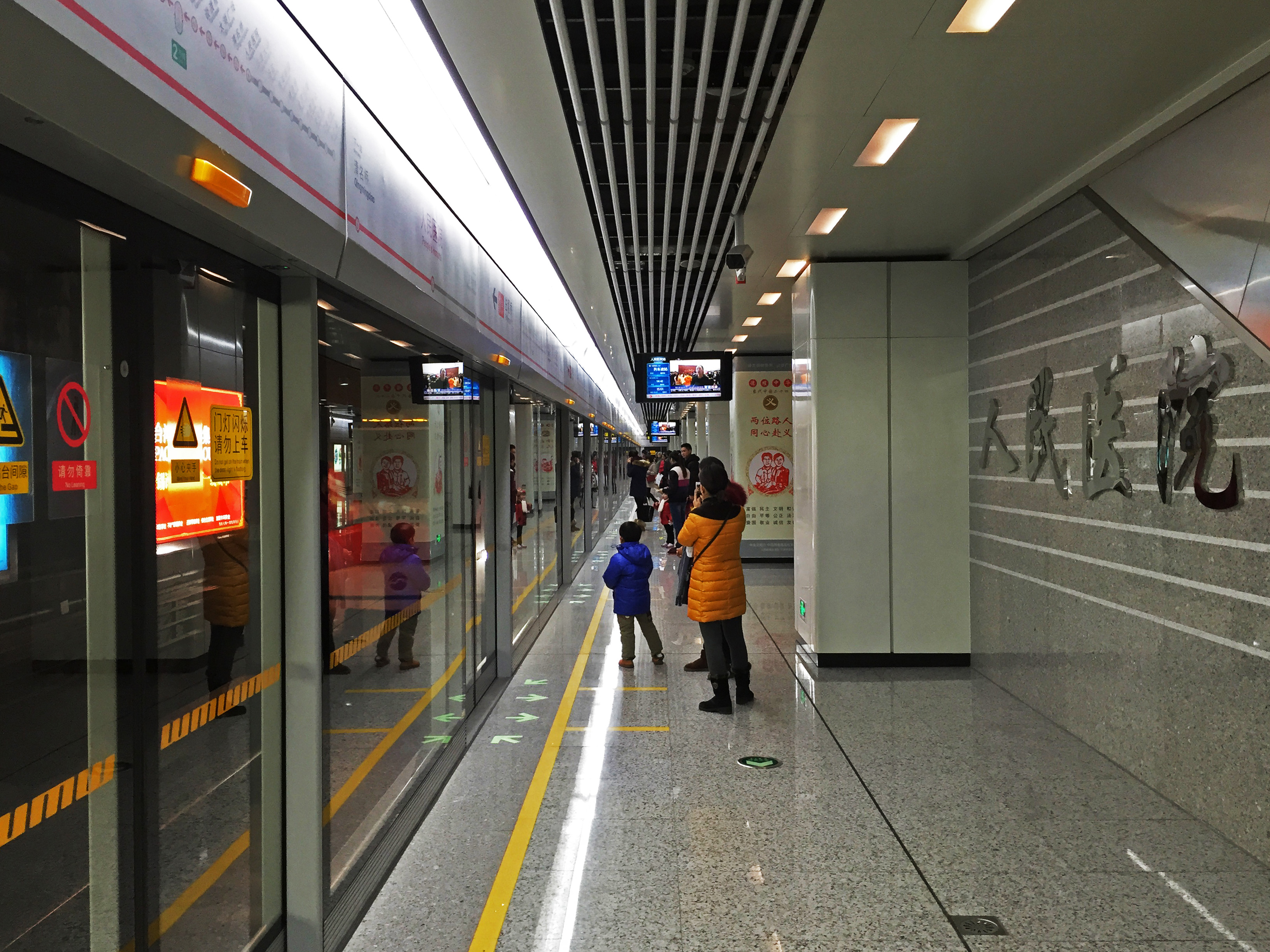
Platform

== Station layout ==
Ground
Ground	Exits

B1	Station Hall	Service Center, Ticket vending machine, Toilet, Elevator, Shops
B2	North	←█ towards Yanqiao
B2	Island Platform, doors will open on the left
B2	South	█ towards Nanfangquan→

B3	West	←█ towards Lihu
B3	Island Platform, doors will open on the left
B3	East	█ towards Dongbeitang→

== Exits ==
There are 5 exits for this station.
