= Sumiao station =

Station of Wuxi Metro

Sumiao 苏庙

General information
- Location: Huishan District, Wuxi, Jiangsu, China
- Operated by: Wuxi Metro Corporation
- Line: Line 3

Services
Preceding station	Wuxi Metro	Following station
Terminus	Line 3	Qianqiao towards Sunan Shuofang International Airport
Location

Sumiao station (Chinese: 苏庙站) is a metro station that is the north terminus of Line 3 of the Wuxi Metro. It is located in Huishan District, Wuxi, Jiangsu.
