= Chong'an District =

Chong'an 崇安区
- District
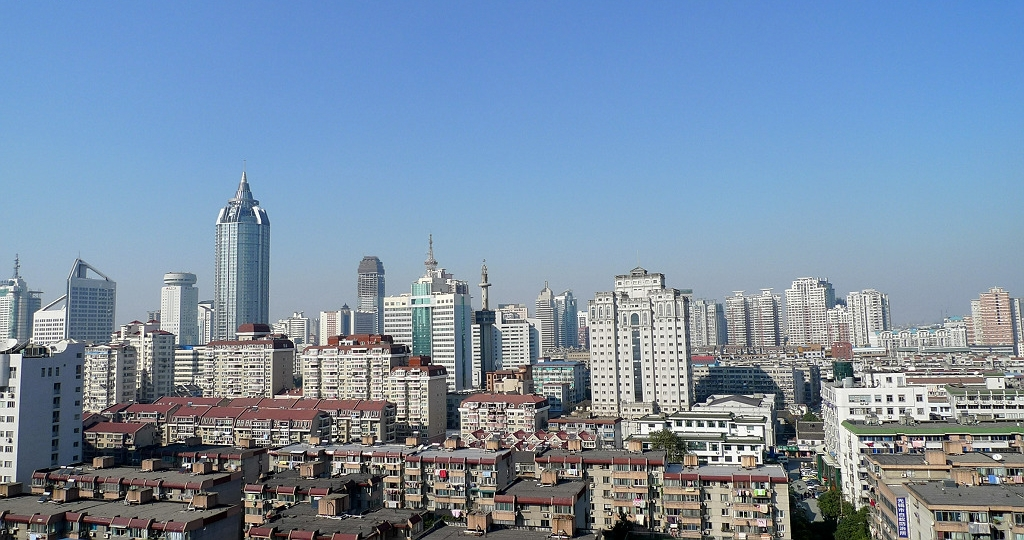
- Downtown Wuxi

- Location in Jiangsu
- Coordinates: 31°35′21″N 120°19′23″E
- Country: People's Republic of China
- Province: Jiangsu
- Prefecture-level city: Wuxi
- Time zone: UTC+8 (China Standard)

Chong'an District (simplified Chinese: 崇安区; traditional Chinese: 崇安區; pinyin: Chóng'ān Qū) is a former district of Wuxi, Jiangsu, China. In 2015, it merged with Nanchang District and Beitang District to form Liangxi District. It is the location of Sanyang Plaza and Chong'an Temple.

== Tourist attractions ==
- Wuxi Mosque
