= Liangxi, Wuxi =

Liangxi 梁溪区
- District
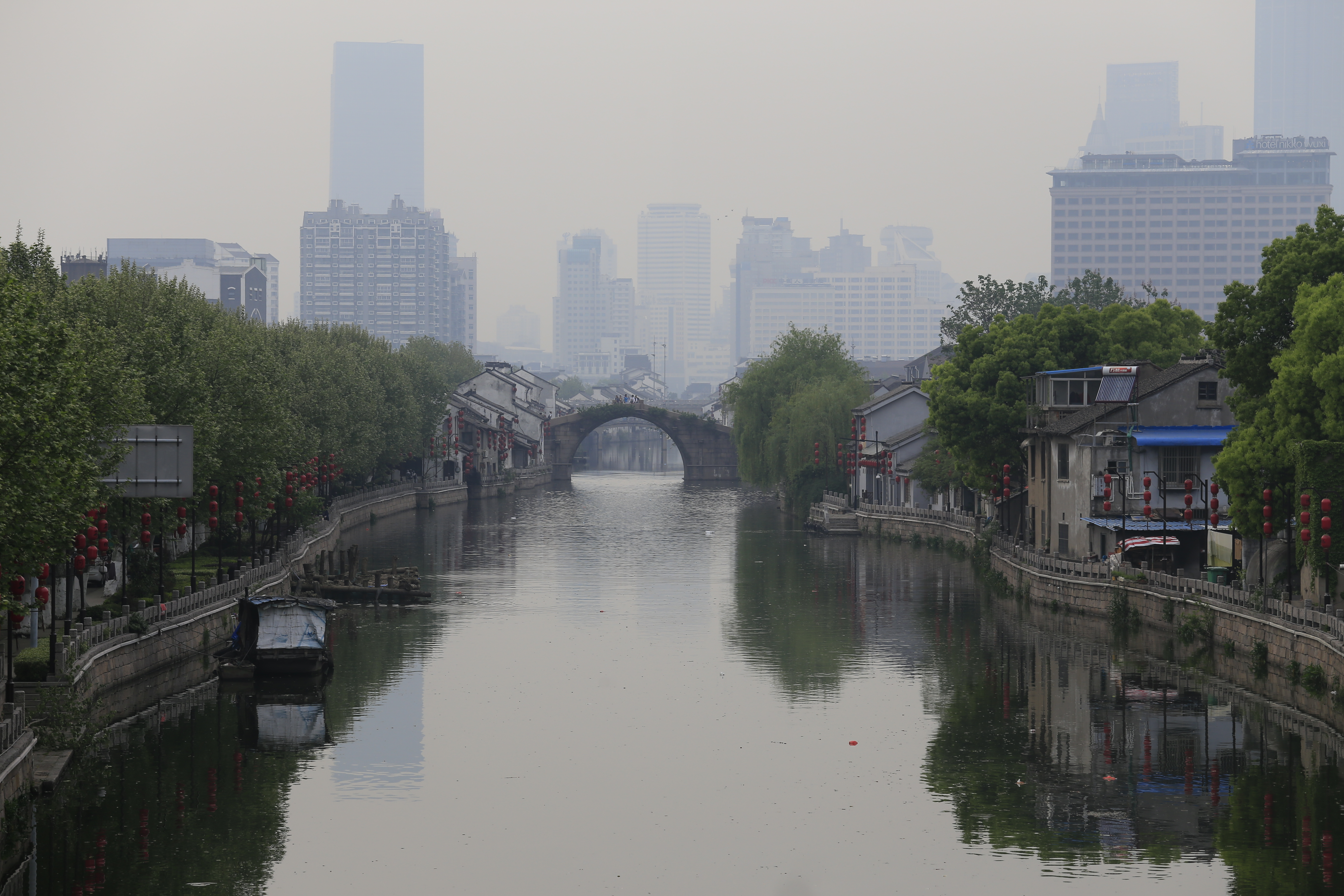
- Grand Canal and Qingming Bridge

- Location in Jiangsu
- Coordinates: 31°35′21″N 120°19′23″E
- Country: People's Republic of China
- Province: Jiangsu
- Prefecture-level city: Wuxi
- Formed: 2015

Area
  - Total: 71.5 km^{2} (27.6 sq mi)

Population (2020 census)
  - Total: 985,465
  - Density: 13,800/km^{2} (35,700/sq mi)
- Time zone: UTC+8 (China Standard)
- Postal Code: 214000
- Website: http://www.wxlx.gov.cn/

Liangxi District (simplified Chinese: 梁溪区; traditional Chinese: 梁溪區; pinyin: Liángxī Qū) is one of five urban districts and the main district of Wuxi, Jiangsu province, China. It was created in 2015 by the merger of the three former districts of Chong'an District, Nanchang District, and Beitang District. The primary Dialect is the Wuxi dialect.

== Administrative divisions ==
The zoning code for Liangxi District is 320213. The district was established in 2015 with the merger of Chong'an, Nanchang and Beitang District. In the present, Liangxi District has 17 subdistricts.

Its administrative office is at 688 Jiefang South Road. The district mayor is Qin Yongxin (秦咏薪) The current Communist Party Secretary for the District is Ju Xie (徐劼).

Administrative level	Former Chong'an District	Former Nanchang District	Former Beitang District
17 Subdistricts	Chong'ansi (崇安寺街道)	Yinglongqiao (路迎龙桥街道)	Huangxiang (路黄巷街道)
	Tongjiang (通江街道)	Nanchansi (路南禅寺街道)	Shanbei (路山北街道)
	Guangruilu (广瑞路街道)	Qingmingqiao (路清名桥街道)	Beidajie (路北大街街道)
	Mashangdun (路上马墩街道)	Jinxing (路金星街道)	Huishan (路惠山街道)
	Jianghai (路江海街道)	Jinkui (路金匮街道)	Wuhe (路五河街道)
	Guangyi (路广益街道)	Yangming (路扬名街道)	

Chong'an Temple Sub-district - The Chong'an Temple Subdistrict is the subdistrict containing the famous temple grounds and is flanked by Tongjiang Street to the Northeast, Beidajie Street to the Northwest and Nanchan Temple Street to the South. The area covers 2.21 square kilometers and has a population of . The permanent population is 55,000, and the registered population is 54,200.

== Famous Sites ==
Donglin Academy - Famous Confucian academy built in between the Song and Ming Dynasties (AD 1111) by neo-Confucian scholar Yang Shi.

Huishan Temple - a famous Buddhist Temple built during Northern and Southern Dynasties (5th and 6th Century AD). It has been destroyed and rebuilt multiple times. It serves as a historical landmark.

Chong'an Temple - One of the most famous Buddhist temples in China. It was destroyed during the revolution of 1911 and No. 1 Park was built in its place.

Nanchan Temple - Located near the south gate of Wuxi, it is one of the 480 built during the Southern Dynasties and is adjacent to the Qingming Bridge connecting to Nanchang Street.

Huishan Spring - A famous spring in Wuxi.

Jichang Garden - A state council garden project.

== Famous People ==
Qian Zhongshu - famous writer.

Xue Fucheng - Qing Dynasty diplomat.

Hua Yanjun (a.k.a. A Bing) - Famous Taoist musician.
