= Beitang District =

Beitang 北塘区
- District
- Location in Jiangsu
- Coordinates: 31°36′11″N 120°16′41″E
- Country: People's Republic of China
- Province: Jiangsu
- Prefecture-level city: Wuxi

Area
  - Total: 31.5 km^{2} (12.2 sq mi)

Population (2001)
  - Total: 350,000
  - Density: 11,000/km^{2} (29,000/sq mi)
- Time zone: UTC+8 (China Standard)

Beitang District (simplified Chinese: 北塘区; traditional Chinese: 北塘區; pinyin: Běitáng Qū) was a former urban district of Wuxi in Jiangsu, China.

== History ==
The Beitang District covered an area of 31.12 square kilometers.

In the fifth national census in 2000, the total population of Beitang District was 190,124. In 2011, the district had a population of 254,327 people.

In 2015, the State Council approved the cancellation of Chong'an District, Nanchang District, and Beitang District, and combined them to form the Liangxi District in Wuxi.
