= Nanchang District =

Nanchang 南长区
- District
- Location in Jiangsu
- Coordinates: 31°32′47″N 120°18′49″E
- Country: People's Republic of China
- Province: Jiangsu
- Prefecture-level city: Wuxi
- Time zone: UTC+8 (China Standard)

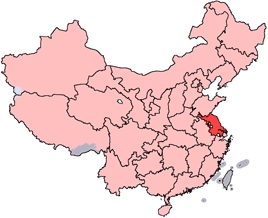

Nanchang District (simplified Chinese: 南长区; traditional Chinese: 南長區; pinyin: Nán Cháng Qū, Wu: Nu Zang Qu) is one of six urban districts of Wuxi, Jiangsu province, China.

Southeast of the city center, the district includes more ancient infrastructure and historically important sites. The area is also densely industrial.
