= Gedaiqiao station =

Metro station in Wuxi, China

Gedaiqiao 葛埭桥
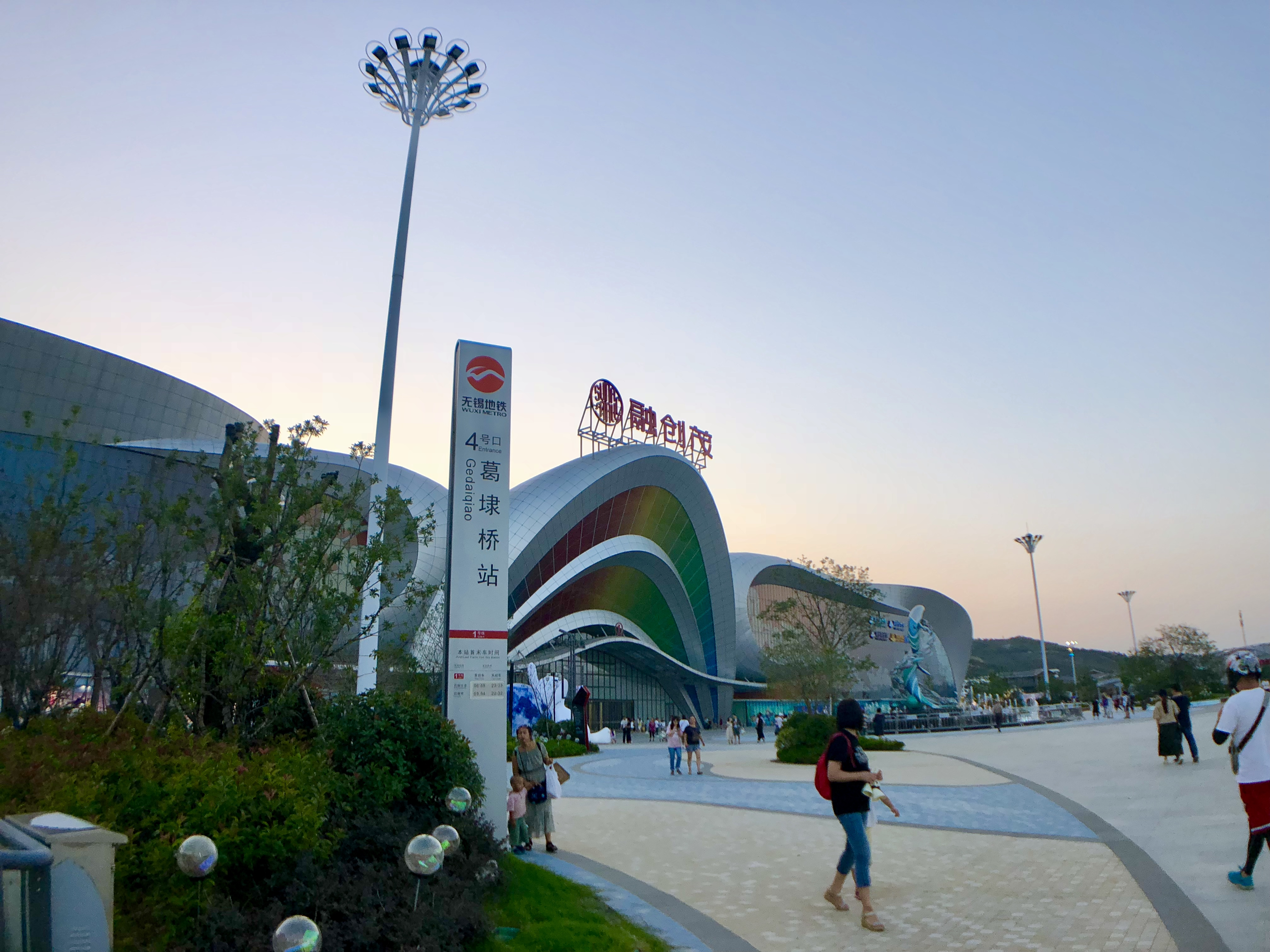
- Getaiqiao Station Exit 4

General information
- Coordinates: 31.4497°N 120.2701°E
- Operator: Wuxi Metro
- Line: Line 1
- Platforms: 1 island platform

History
- Opened: 28 September 2019

Services
Preceding station	Wuxi Metro	Following station
Xuelang towards Yanqiao	Line 1	Nanfangquan Terminus
Location

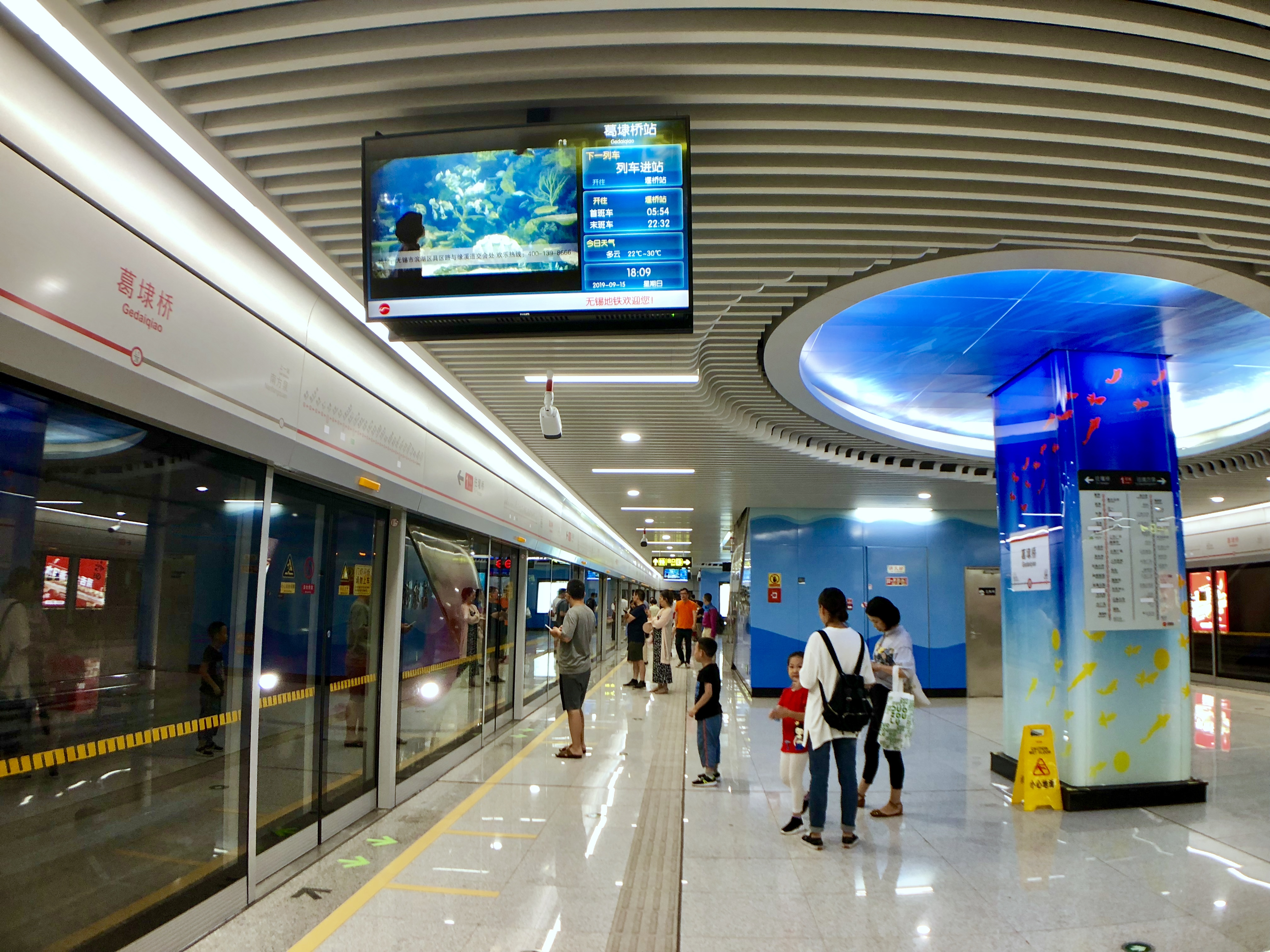
Gedaiqiao Station Platform

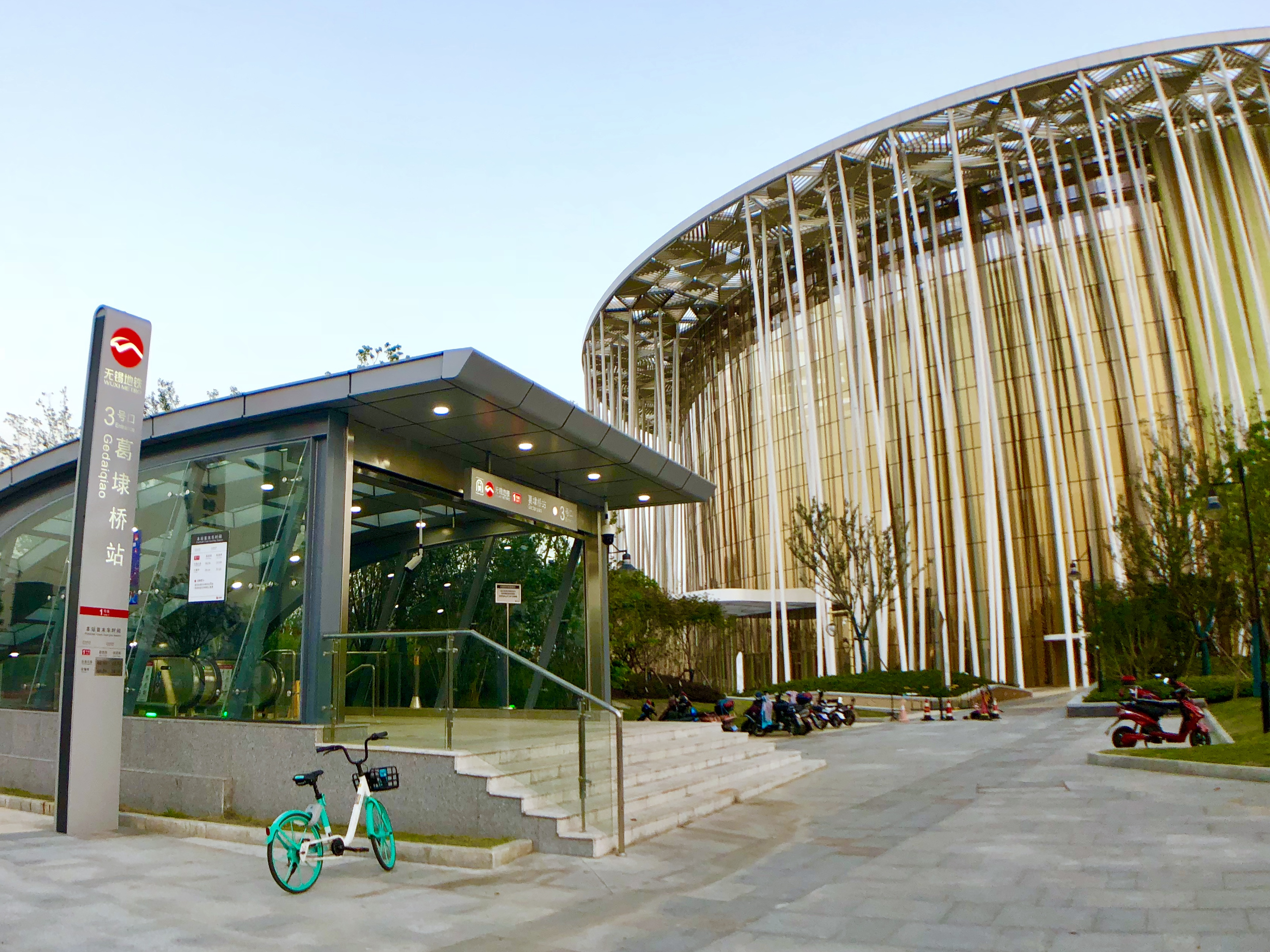
Gedaiqiao Station Exit 3

Gedaiqiao station is located on the west side of Yuanxi Road in Binhu District, Wuxi, China, and within Wuxi Sunac Cultural Tourism City. It is the second station on the south extension of Wuxi Metro Line 1 and opened for operation on September 28, 2019.

Gedaiqiao Station is the 26th station of Wuxi Metro Line 1 from north to south, and the second station of the southern extension of Line 1. The station runs diagonally south from Xuelang station across the Lihu Avenue Overpass, and then passes between the Anji Dun and Hongkou Dun ruins. The station is located near Sunac Cultural Tourism City on Yuanxi Road. The station is to the north of Sunac City and to the south. It is located in the Taihu Lake Show and Wanda Hotel area. It is a standard underground two-story island station with a platform width of 12 meters.

Because Sunac City was originally a "Wanda City" invested by Wanda Group, the station was originally named "Gedai Wanda City Station" during planning.
