= Jiangnan University station =

Wuxi Metro station

Coordinates: 31°29′08″N 120°16′27″E

Jiangnan University Station 江南大学站
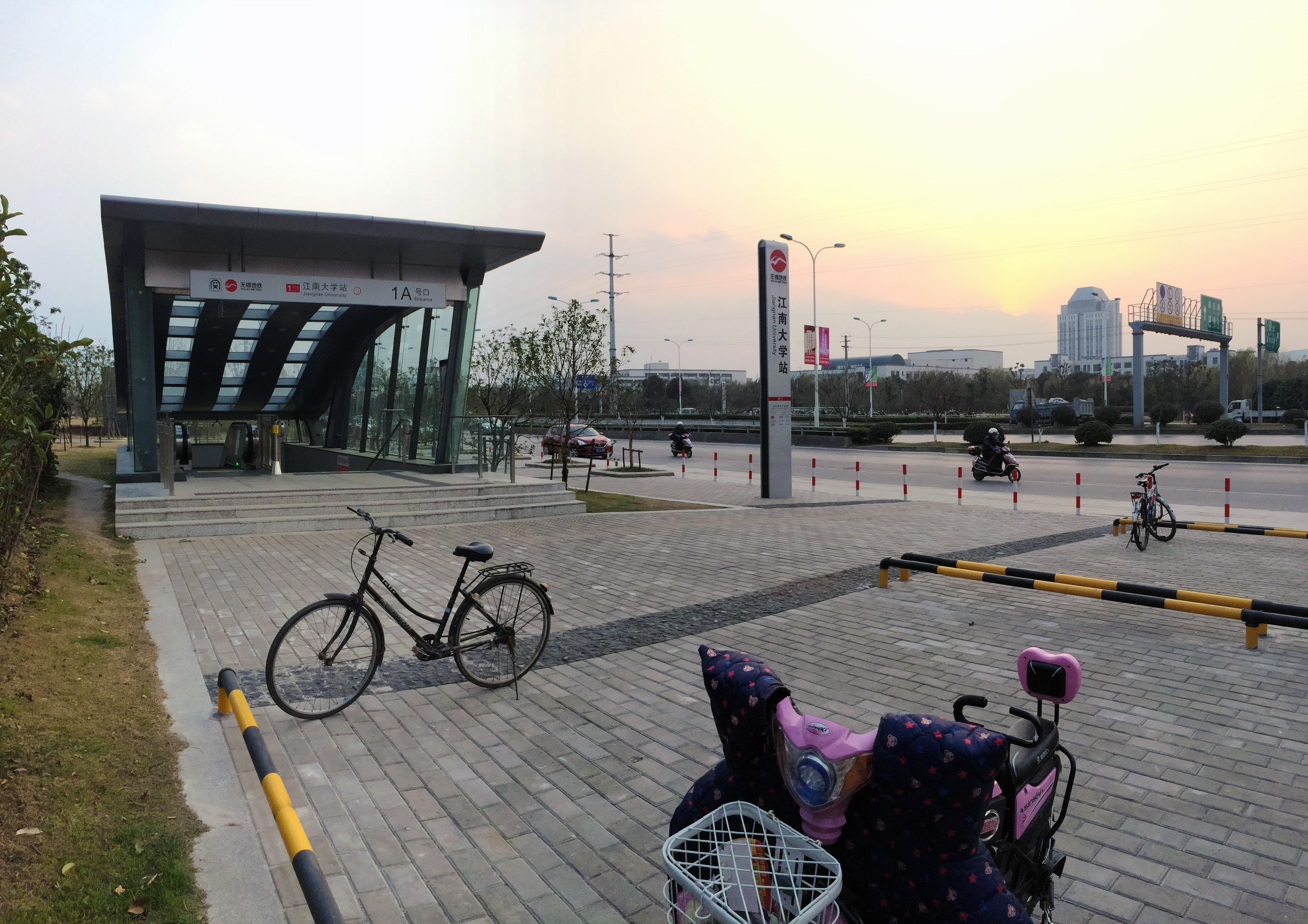
- Exit 1A

General information
- Location: Binhu District, Wuxi, Jiangsu; China
- Operated by: Wuxi Metro Corporation
- Line: Line 1
- Platforms: 2 (1 island platform)

Construction
- Structure type: Underground

History
- Opened: 1 July 2014

Services
Preceding station	Wuxi Metro	Following station
Cultural Palace towards Yanqiao	Line 1	Changguangxi towards Nanfangquan
Location

Jiangnan University Station (Chinese: 江南大学站) is a metro station of Line 1 of the Wuxi Metro. It started operations on 1 July 2014. The station is near Jiangnan University.

== Station layout ==
Ground
Ground	Exits

B1	Station Hall	Service Center, Ticket vending machine, Toilet, Elevator
B2	North	←█ towards Yanqiao
B2	Island Platform, doors will open on the left
B2	South	█ towards Nanfangquan→

== Exits ==
There are 3 exits for this station.

== Gallery ==
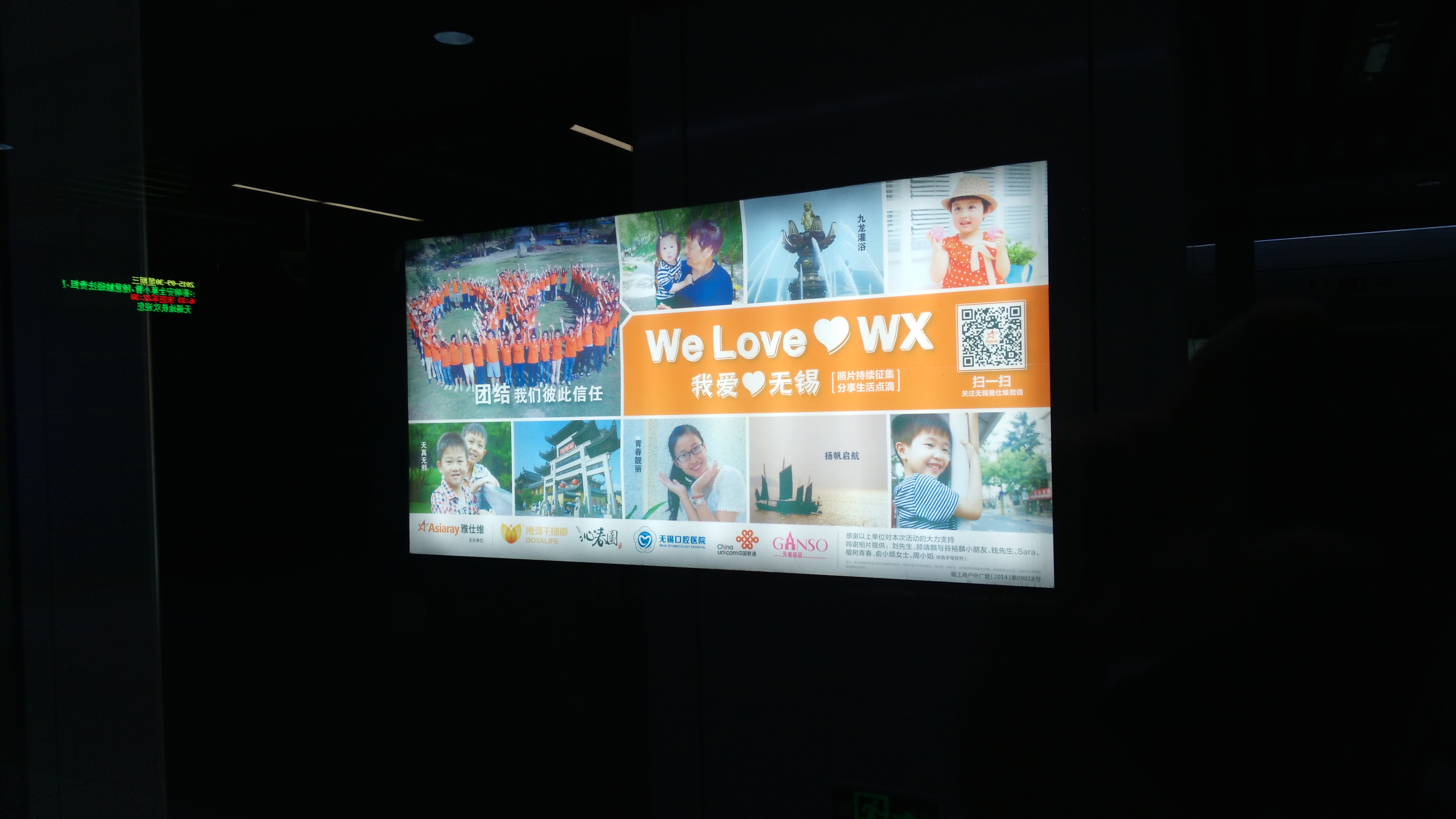
Station poster

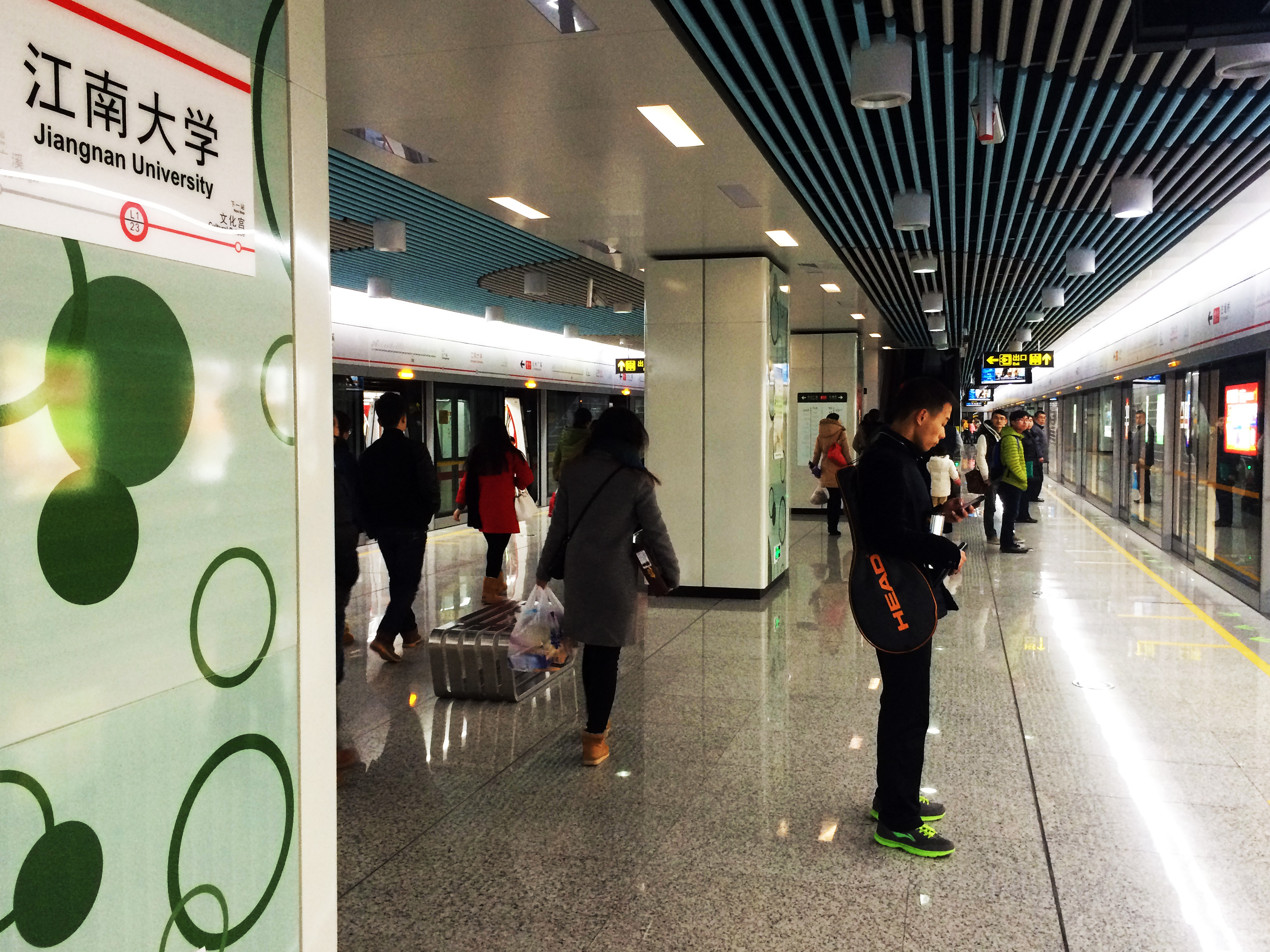
Platform

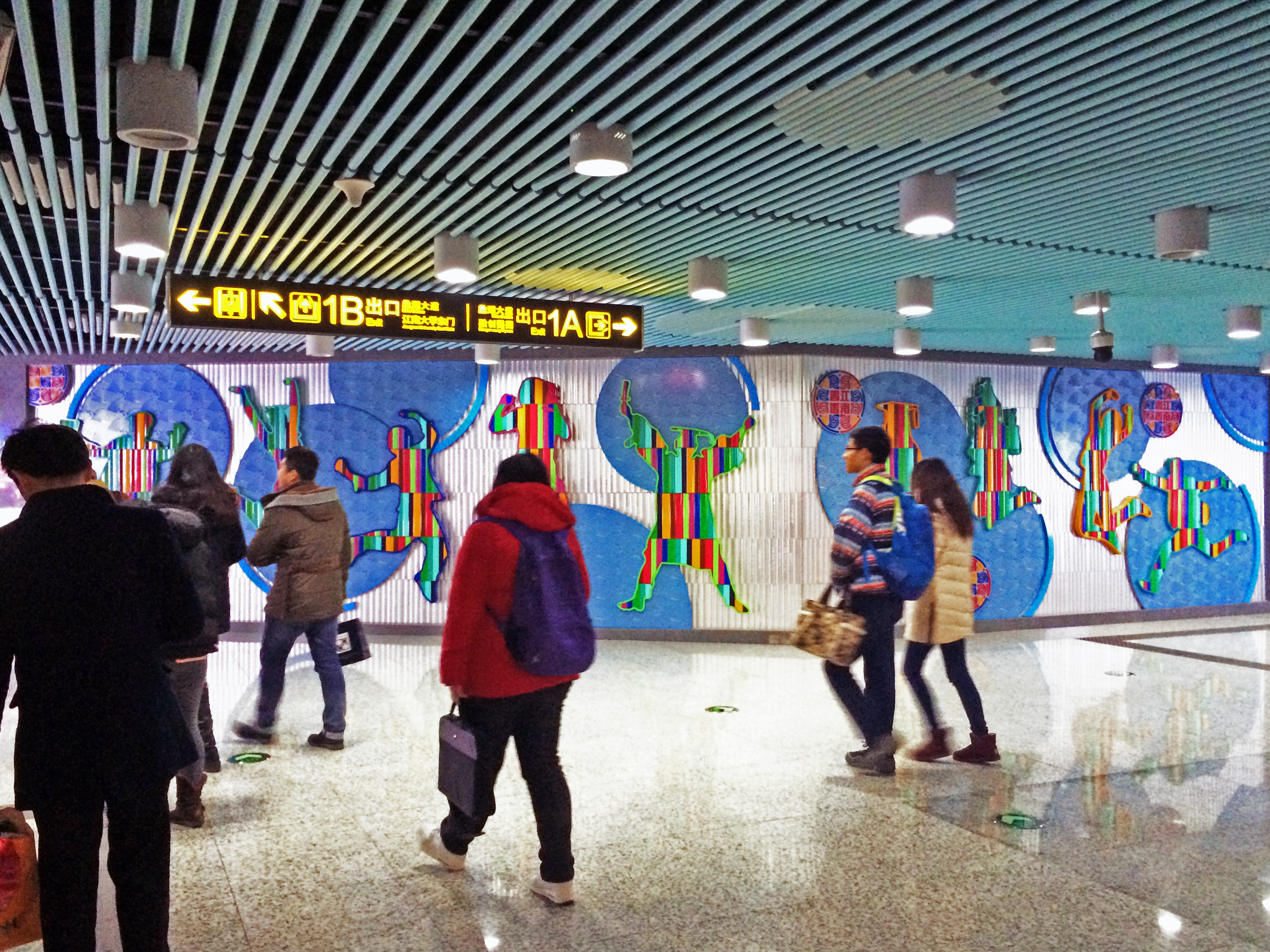
Cultural Wall
