= Cultural Palace station =

Metro station in Wuxi, Jiangsu, China

Coordinates: 31°29′31″N 120°17′12″E

Cultural Palace 文化宫
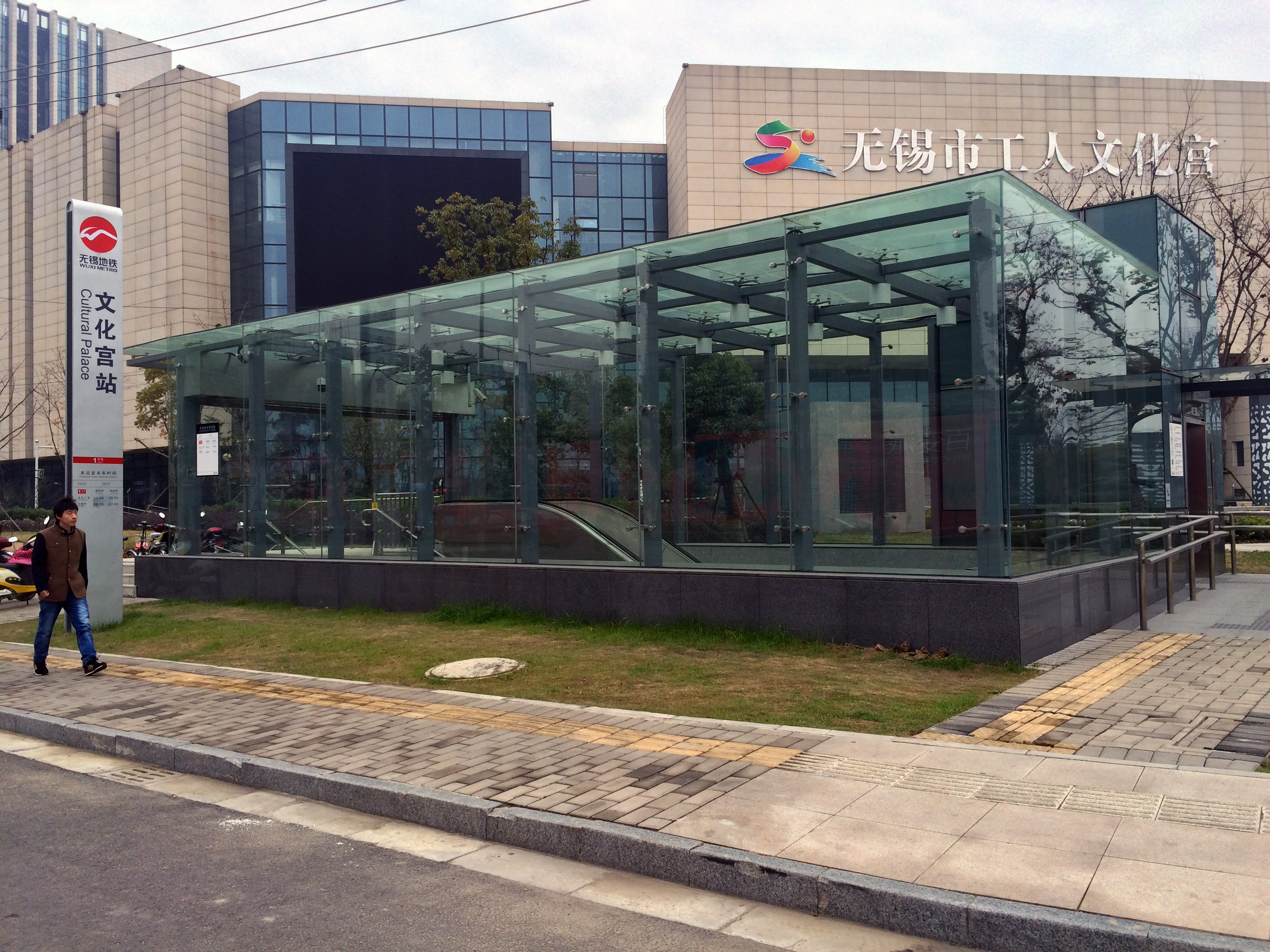
- Exit 3A

General information
- Location: Binhu District, Wuxi, Jiangsu; China
- Operator: Wuxi Metro Corporation
- Line: Line 1
- Platforms: 2 (1 island platform)

Construction
- Structure type: Underground

History
- Opened: 1 July 2014

Services
Preceding station	Wuxi Metro	Following station
Civic Center towards Yanqiao	Line 1	Jiangnan University towards Nanfangquan
Location

Cultural Palace Station (Chinese: 文化宫站) is a metro station of Line 1 of the Wuxi Metro. It started operations on 1 July 2014.

== Station layout ==
Ground
Ground	Exits

B1	Station Hall	Service Center, Ticket vending machine, Toilet, Elevator, Shops
B2	East	←█ towards Yanqiao
B2	Island Platform, doors will open on the left
B2	West	█ towards Nanfangquan→

== Exits ==
There are five exits for this station.

== Gallery ==
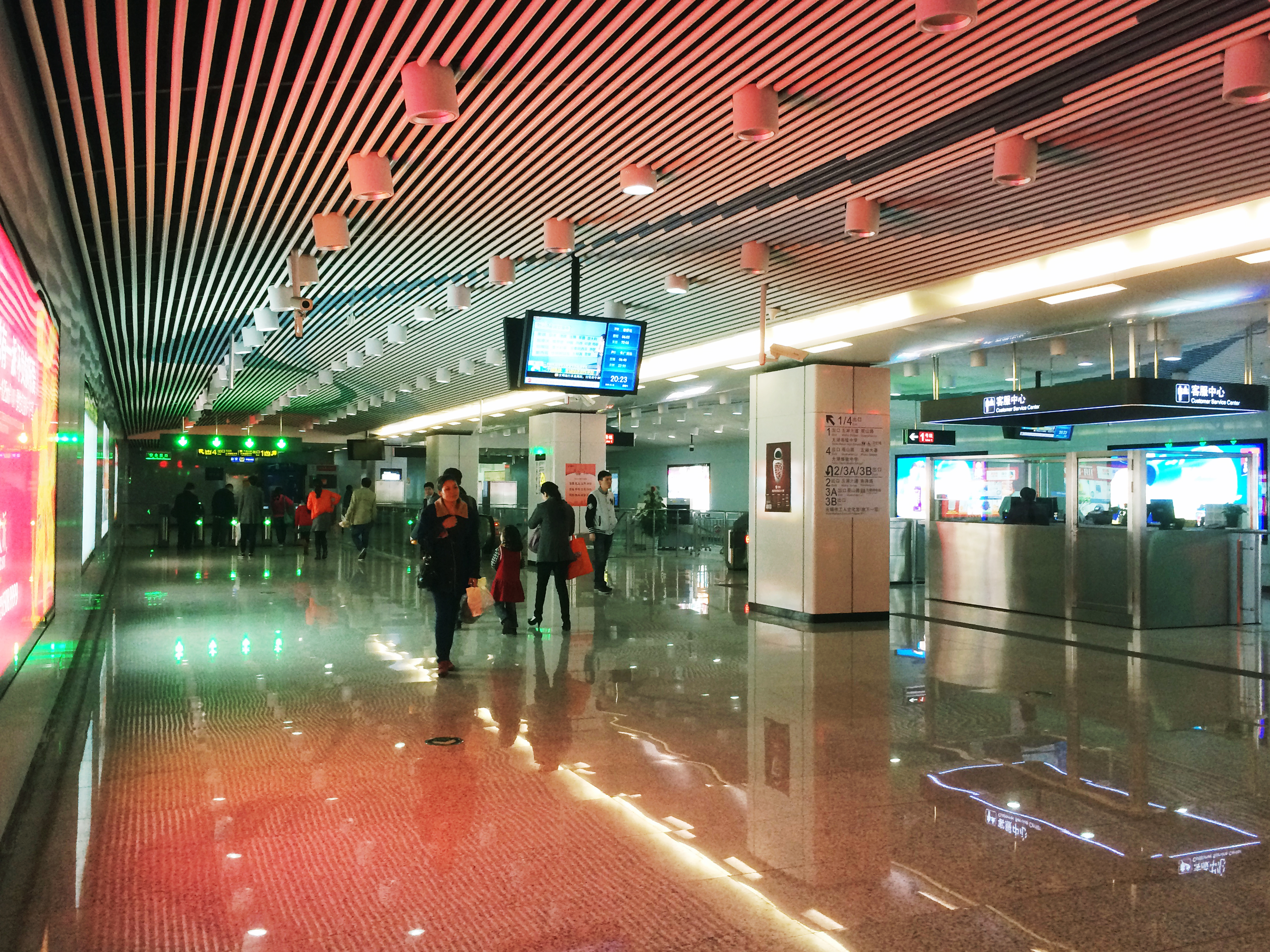
Station Hall

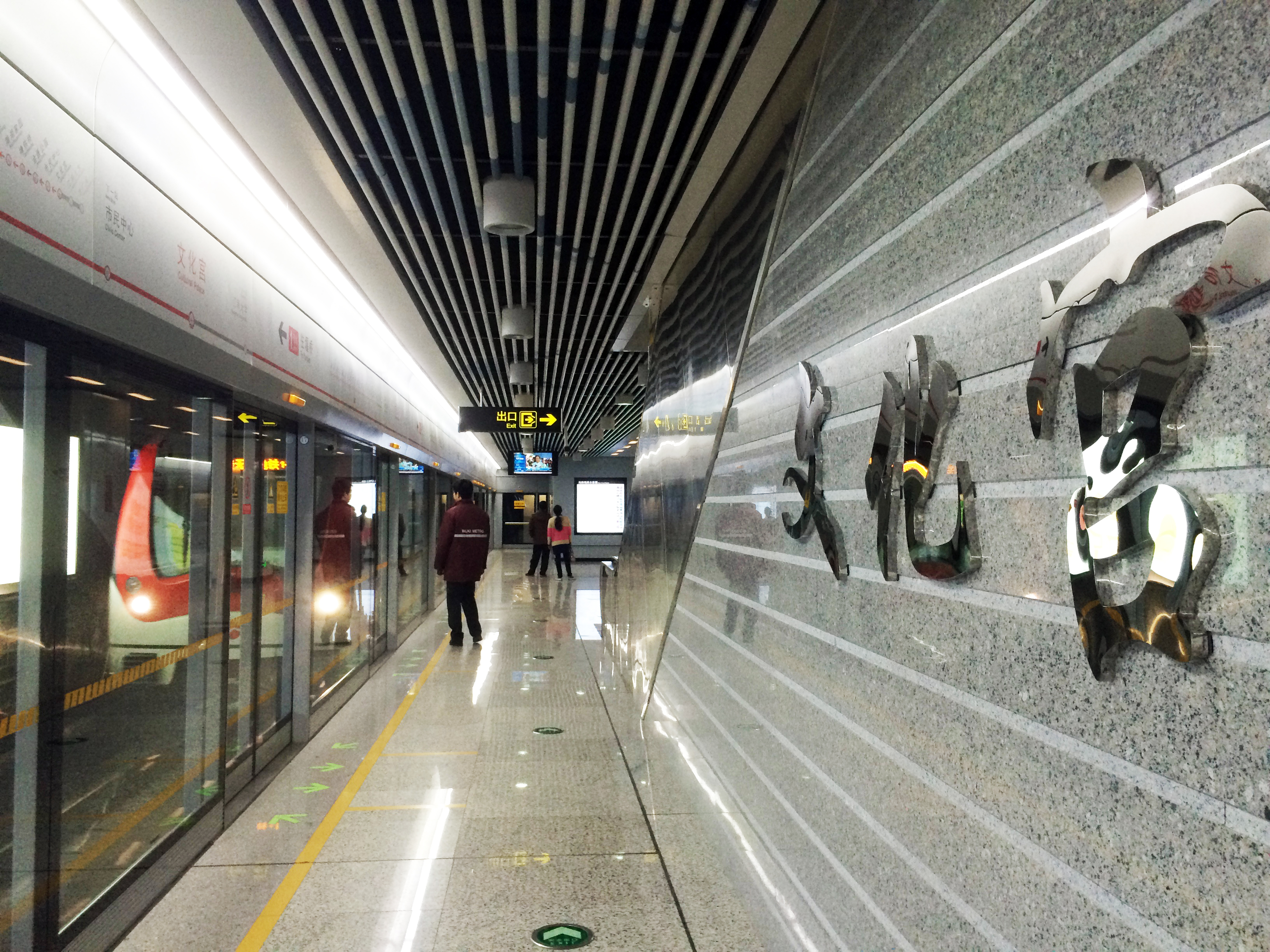
Platform
