= Xuelang station =

Metro station in Wuxi, China

Coordinates: 31°27′46″N 120°16′29″E

Xuelang 雪浪
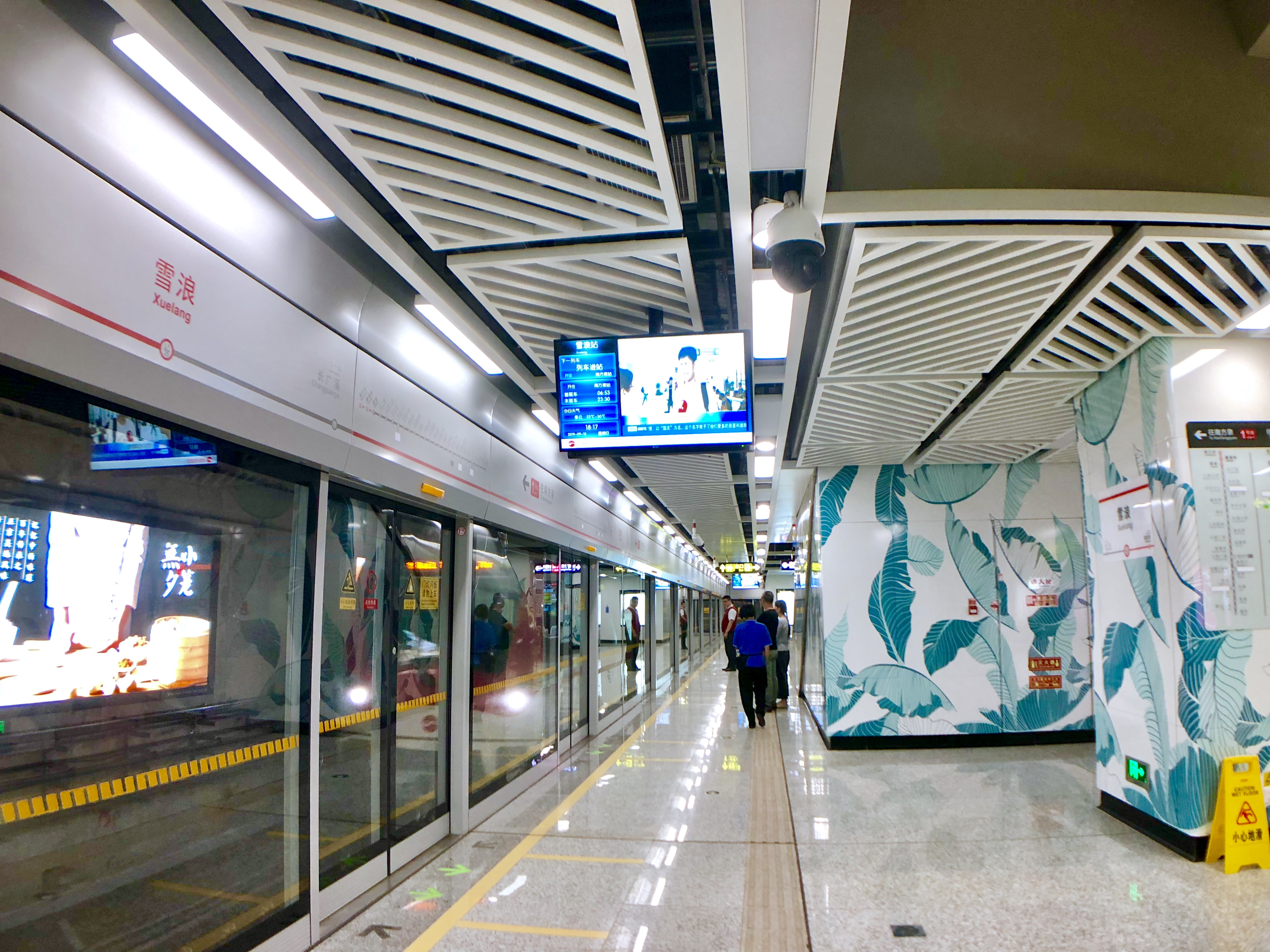
- Platform

General information
- Operator: Wuxi Metro
- Line: Line 1
- Platforms: 1 island platform
- Tracks: 2

Other information
- Station code: L125

History
- Opened: 28 September 2019

Services
Preceding station	Wuxi Metro	Following station
Changguangxi towards Yanqiao	Line 1	Gedaiqiao towards Nanfangquan
Location

Xuelang station is located on the north side of the intersection of Pinghu Road and Shangde Road in Binhu District, Wuxi. It opened on 28 September 2019, as part of a southbound extension of Wuxi Metro Line 1.

== Overview ==
Xuelang, the first station on Line 1 built south of Changguangxi station, will be developed in conjunction with the upper cover of the Xuelang Parking Lot. It was opened on 28 September 2019.
