= Changguangxi station =

Wuxi Metro station

Coordinates: 31°28′31″N 120°16′22″E

Changguangxi 长广溪
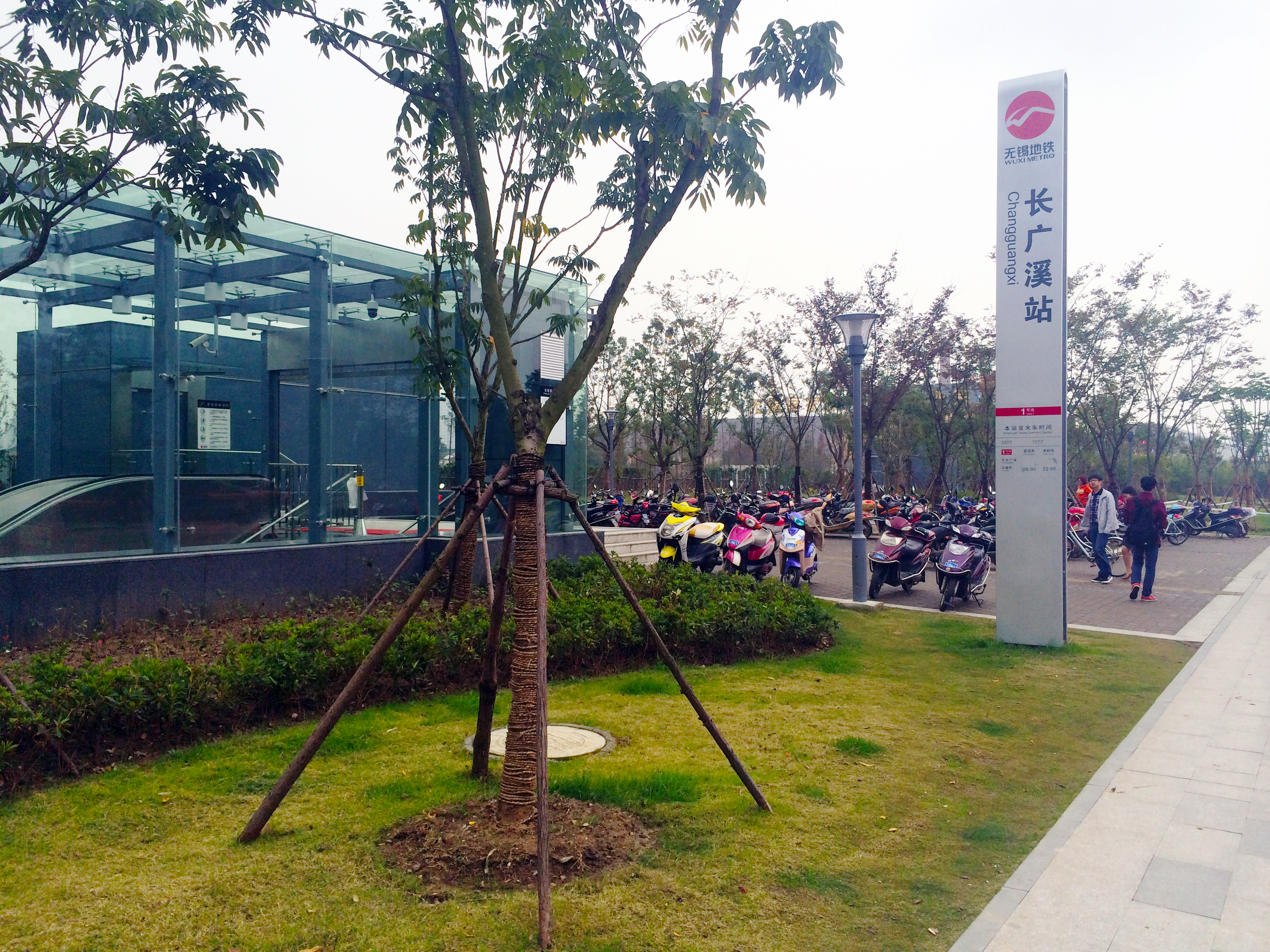
- Exit 4

General information
- Location: Binhu District, Wuxi, Jiangsu; China
- Operated by: Wuxi Metro Corporation
- Line: Line 1
- Platforms: 2 (1 island platform)

Construction
- Structure type: Underground

History
- Opened: 1 July 2014

Services
Preceding station	Wuxi Metro	Following station
Jiangnan University towards Yanqiao	Line 1	Xuelang towards Nanfangquan
Location

Changguangxi Station (Chinese: 长广溪站) is the station of Line 1 of the Wuxi Metro. It started operations on 1 July 2014.

== Station layout ==
Ground
Ground	Exits

B1	Station Hall	Service Center, Ticket vending machine, Toilet, Shops
B2	North	←█ towards Yanqiao
B2	Island Platform, doors will open on the left
B2	South	→█ towards Nanfangquan

== Exits ==
There are 3 exits for this station.
