= Metz Cathedral =

Catholic cathedral in Metz, France

Metz Cathedral Cathedral of Saint Stephen, Metz Cathédrale Saint Étienne de Metz
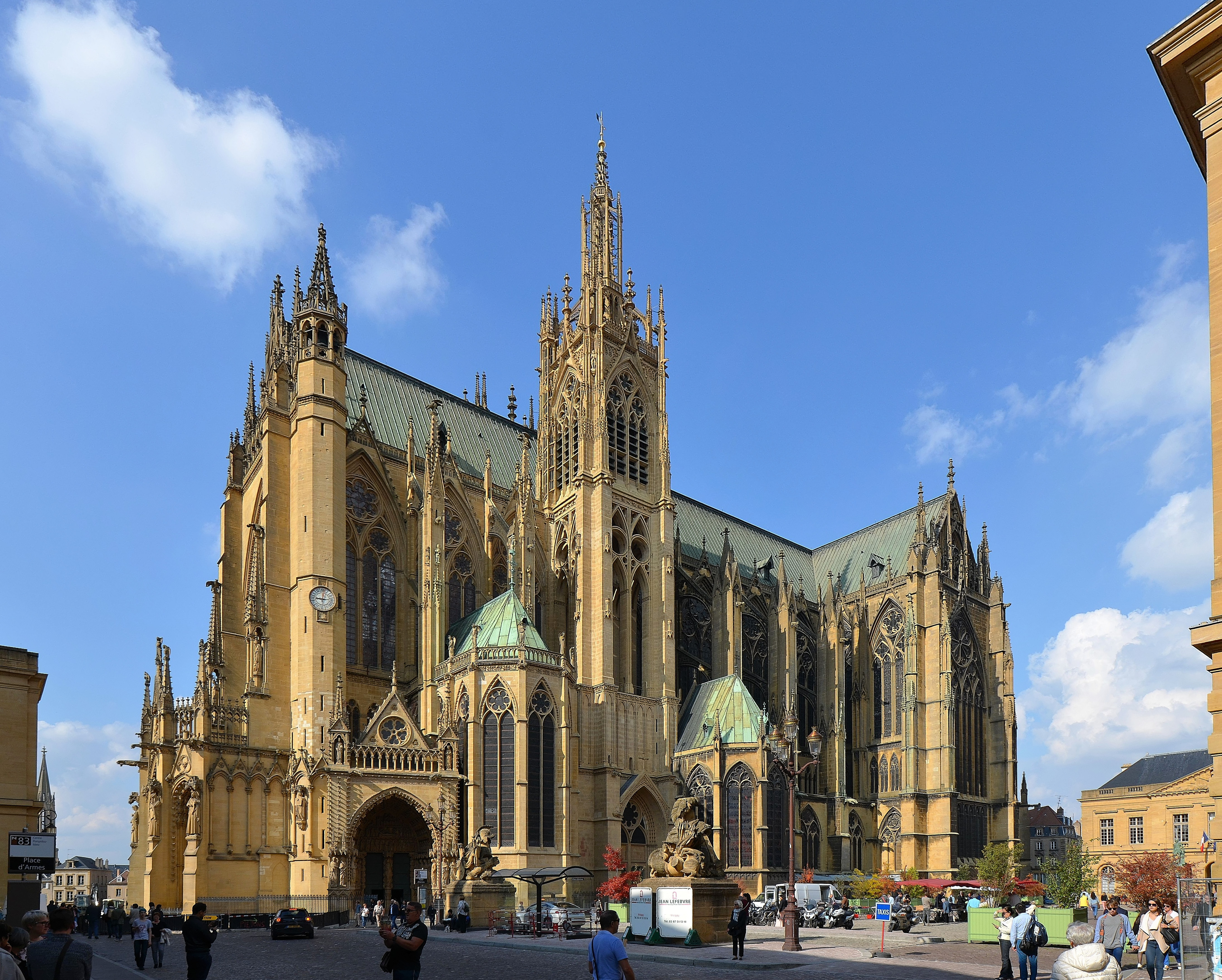
- Metz Cathedral from the south in 2017

Religion
- Affiliation: Catholic Church
- Diocese: Diocese of Metz
- Rite: Roman
- Ecclesiastical or organisational status: Cathedral
- Leadership: Philippe Ballot
- Year consecrated: 11 April 1552
- Status: Active

Location
- Location: Metz, France
- Interactive map of Metz Cathedral; Cathedral of Saint Stephen, Metz; Cathédrale Saint Étienne de Metz
- Coordinates: 49.12°N 6.1754°E

Architecture
- Type: Church
- Style: French Gothic; Gothic Revival
- Groundbreaking: c. 1220–1240
- Completed: 1550

Specifications
- Direction of façade: West
- Length: 136 metres (446 ft)
- Height (max): 88 metres (289 ft) (Mutte tower)
- Materials: Jaumont Stone
- Monument historique
- Official name: Cathédrale Saint Étienne de Metz
- Designated: 1930
- Reference no.: PA00106817
- Denomination: Église

Website
- www.cathedrale-metz.fr

Metz Cathedral is the cathedral of the Catholic Diocese of Metz, the seat of the bishops of Metz. It is dedicated to Saint Stephen. The diocese dates back at least to the 4th century and construction of the present Gothic cathedral began in the 13th century. In the mid-14th century, it was joined to the collegiate church of Notre-Dame, and given a new transept and late Gothic chevet, finished between 1486 and 1520. The cathedral treasury displays a rich collection assembled over the long centuries of the history of the Metz diocese and include sacred vestments and items used for the Eucharist.

Metz Cathedral has the third-highest nave of cathedrals in France (41.41 meters (135.9 ft), after the cathedrals of Amiens and Beauvais. It is nicknamed la Lanterne du Bon Dieu ("the Good Lord's lantern"), on account of its displaying the largest expanse of stained glass in the world, totalling 6,496 m^{2} (69,920 sq ft). The stained glass windows include works by Gothic and Renaissance master glass makers Hermann von Münster, Theobald of Lixheim, and Valentin Bousch. Later artistic styles are represented by Charles-Laurent Maréchal (Romanticism), Roger Bissière (Tachism), Jacques Villon (Cubism), Marc Chagall, and Kimsooja.. Since 2014, the cathedral has been part of "Metz royale et impériale", a site covering the historic centre of Metz and its early 20th-century German extension, on France's Tentative List for World Heritage status.

== History ==
=== Early churches ===
A Gallo-Roman oppidum, or fortified town, called Diuodron Medimatriques, occupied the site from at least the first century B.C. It became a stop on the trade route between Lyon and Treves, and was an imperial residence during the Roman Empire between 306 and 390. The presence of the first bishop, Clement, is recorded in 346.

The cathedral was built on an ancient site dating to the 5th century and dedicated to Saint Stephen. It is said to have contained a collection of his relics. According to Gregory of Tours, the shrine of Saint Stephen was the sole structure spared during the sack of 451 by Attila's Huns. It was a royal residence of the grandsons of Clovis, king of the Franks, and of Theudebert I, who became the Merovingian ruler in 534.

Gregory of Tours mentioned the existence of the church in 584, and a cathedral under the archbishop Arnoul is mentioned in 616. The Archbishop and Saint Chrodegang (742–766) is mentioned in accounts of the time as a papal envoy to the Franks. He is credited with introducing the Roman liturgy and chants, with the support of King of the Franks, Pepin, between 751 and 768. Chrodegang is also credited with establishing the first cathedral chapter in western Europe, and also the first cathedral close, combining chapels, dormitory, refectory, and other functional buildings. This system was formally adopted by other Frankish cathedrals under the Capitulary of Aix-en-Chapelle of 816. This first cloister, on the south side of the cathedral where the Place des Armes is located, survived until its demolition in 1754.

=== The Ottonian or Pre-Romanesque cathedral ===
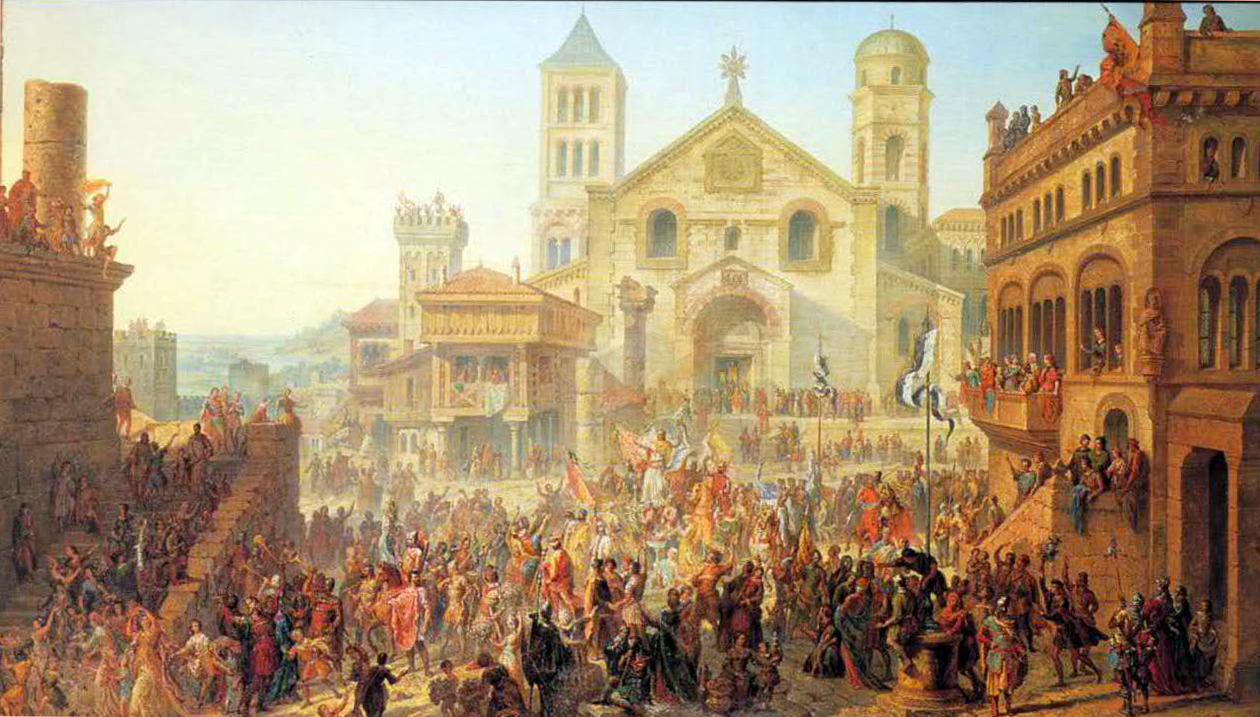
The Romanesque or Ottonian cathedral in 1055 imagined by Auguste Migette (1862)

In 843, after long disputes between Charlemagne's successors, the Holy Roman Empire was divided into four parts. In 870, Metz and its province Lorraine allied with East Francia while remaining an autonomous duchy. In 962, when Otto I, Holy Roman Emperor, restored the Empire, Lorraine was designated as the autonomous Duchy of Lorraine, with Metz as its capital. It maintained this status until 1766, when it formally became part of France.

The construction of a new cathedral began under bishop Thierry I between 965 and 984, and was completed under his second successor Thierry II of Luxembourg, between 1006 and 1047. It was built in what was later called Ottonian style, a form of pre-Romanesque. This church had two towers and three bays on the west front, a nave with three vessels, and a larger tower over the transept. Because of its placement on a terrace next to the Moselle River, the cathedral could not have the traditional east to west orientation from the choir to the west front. Instead, it was oriented on an axis from southeast to northwest. The roof, following a regional tradition, was covered with tiles of white limestone.

A smaller church, the Collegiale of Notre-Dame-la-Ronde, was built close to the old cathedral in the 8th century, and was entirely rebuilt between 1200 and 1207 to be oriented directly with the axis of the cathedral. The complex of early buildings also included the cloister and a palace for the archbishop, where the market square is located today.

=== The Gothic Cathedral ===
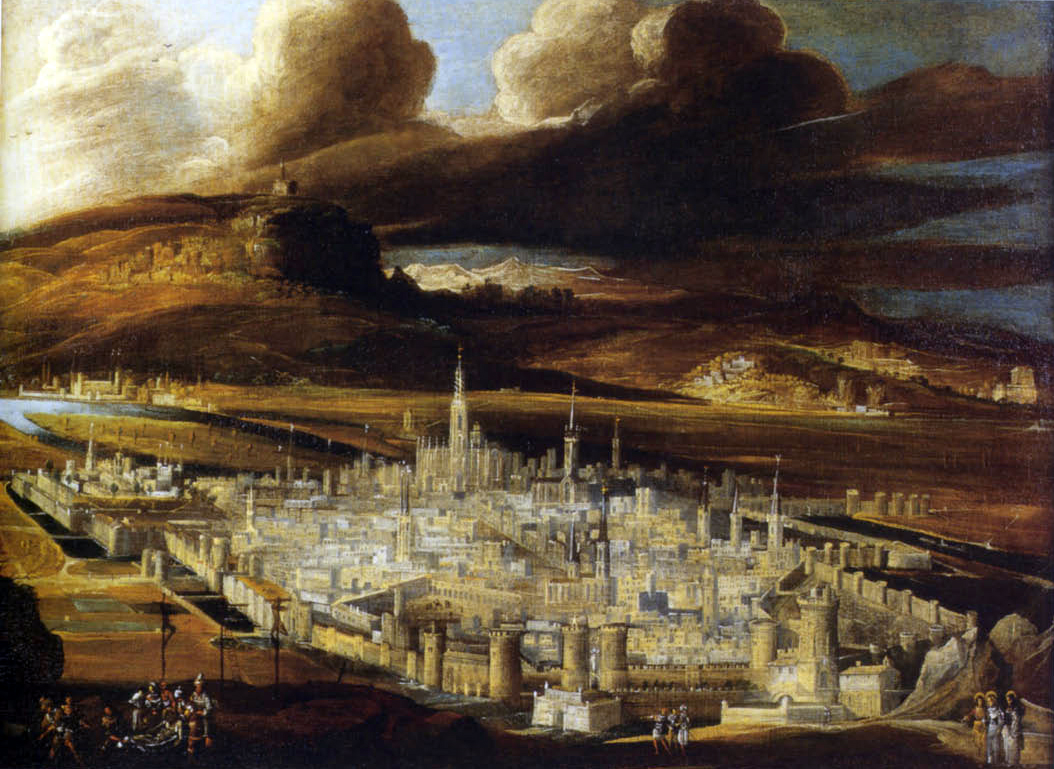
Metz and the cathedral in the 17th century

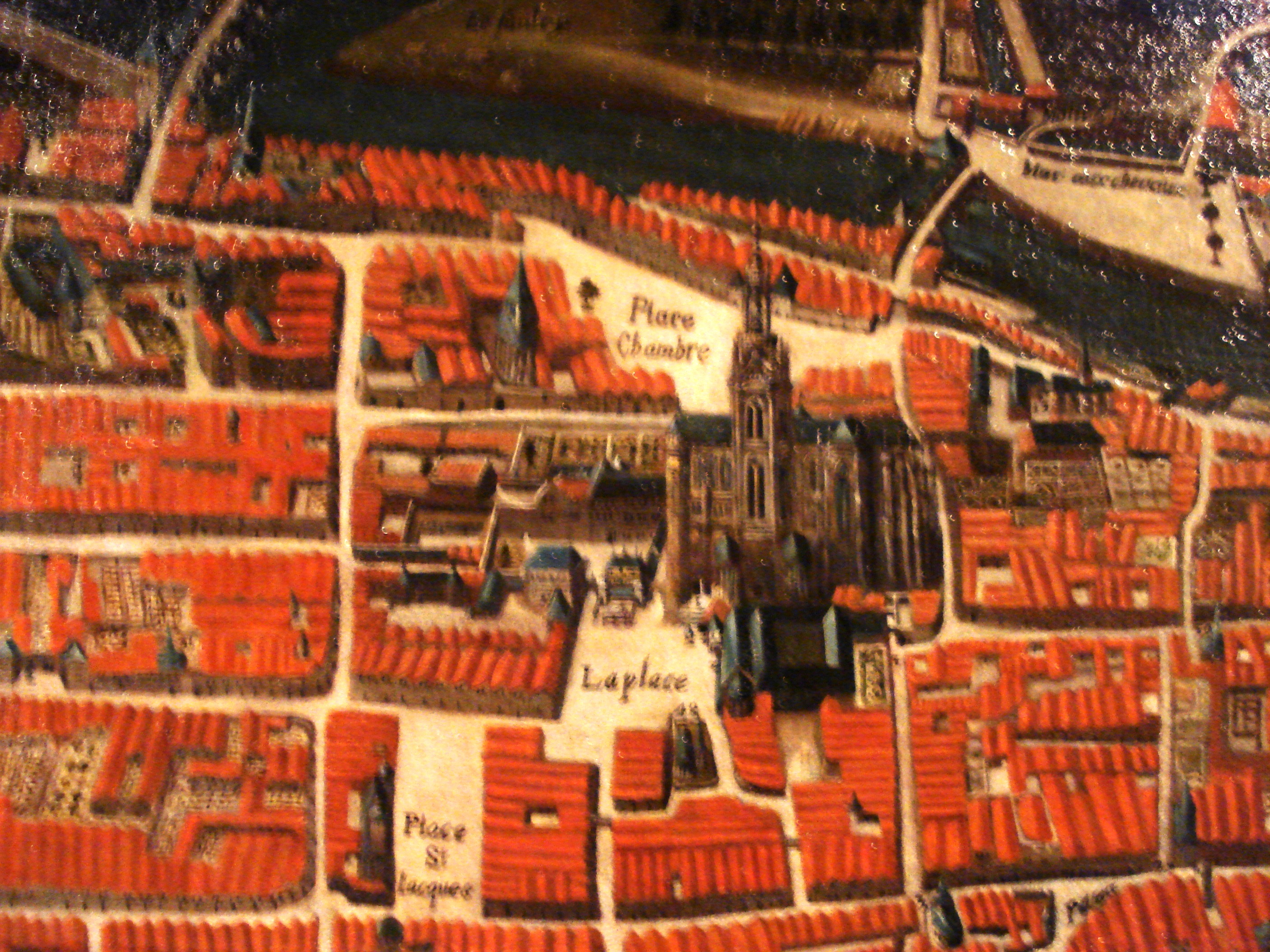
City centre and the cathedral in the 17th century

The reconstruction of the cathedral in the Gothic style was proposed in about 1220 by the bishop of Metz, Conrad III of Scharfenberg, the chancellor of Frederick II, Holy Roman Emperor. The work began under James of Lotharingia (French: Jacques de Lorraine, German: Jakob von Lothringen), the head of the chapter, who became bishop in 1239. The art historian Alain Villes has argued that the documents of about 1220 concern confirmations of the chapter's prebends rather than the start of building work, and that the reconstruction of the cathedral and of the collegiate church of Notre-Dame-la-Ronde began around 1235–1240. Construction began at the west end of the nave and continued to the transept and the old choir, which was still in place until the end of the 15th century. The vault of the new structure was not planned to be higher than 30–35 meters.

The plan integrated the neighbouring Collegiate church of Our Lady into the western end of the cathedral, which resulted in the absence of a traditional west-end portal. The south-western porch of the cathedral became the entrance of the former collegiate church. ·

The nave, with the exception of its vaults, was probably finished between 1245 and 1250. Then a decision was taken to make the cathedral much taller, with the addition of a new level of large windows about forty meters high, equal in height to the two levels below. New more massive columns were added, and the triforium between the arcades and high windows was enlarged and strengthened to support the greater weight. Between 1250 and 1255 the south side walls west of the transept were also strengthened to support the new higher walls. The south façade was also built higher to match the greater height of the new nave. The piers of the flying buttresses were also reconstructed, doubling their height. In about 1270–75, the tower of the Chapter was raised to the height of the cornice of the new nave.

Since the new nave was now twice as high as planned, the towers also had to be made taller. Between 1275 and 1280, a second level and the beginning of a third level were added to the Tour de la Mutte. By 1359 the nave was entirely covered, but work on the upper walls continued for another twenty years. In 1380–81, the canons of the cathedral decided to demolish the wall which separated the cathedral from the adjoining nave of the church of Our Lady. This was resisted by the clergy of the collegiate church, but the work went ahead, modified by the installation of a grill between the two naves. In 1381 the cathedral chapter engaged the glassmaker Herman of Münster to make a rose window for the west front, which was finished in 1392. Pierre Perrat is documented as master mason of the cathedral from at least 1383, and also worked on the cathedrals of Toul and Verdun; in 1386 he obtained the right to be buried in the cathedral. His epitaph is the only one of a cathedral architect preserved in the building, and a later legend credited him with the whole cathedral, built through a pact with the devil, although he was one of many master masons who succeeded one another on the site between the 13th and 16th centuries.

There was a lull of nearly a century before major work was resumed on the construction of the transept and the choir. In 1388 a wooden belfry was installed by the city government on the La Mutte tower, and a new chapel, the Bishop's Chapel, was added on the lower south aisle in 1443. Its patron, Bishop Conrad Bayer of Boppard, died a few days after the chapel was consecrated, and was interred within it in 1459.

In 1468 a serious fire broke out on the new balustrade of the roof. In the years before the fire, from 1452 to 1467, there had been a bitter dispute between the city leaders and the cathedral authorities over who was responsible for the maintenance and safety of cathedral property, which Bishop George of Baden ended by excommunicating the city leaders. When the fire broke out, the city leaders refused to assist the clergy in fighting the fire, only sending men to put out the fire on the bell tower, which was owned by the city. Relations thereafter between the city and clerical authorities were strained.

The last work on the La Mutte bell tower was completed between 1477 and 1483. The stone shaft forty meters high was topped by a tall spire, giving it a total height of almost ninety meters. The finished cathedral was consecrated on 11 April 1552.

=== Gothic Completion and neoclassical additions (16th–18th century) ===
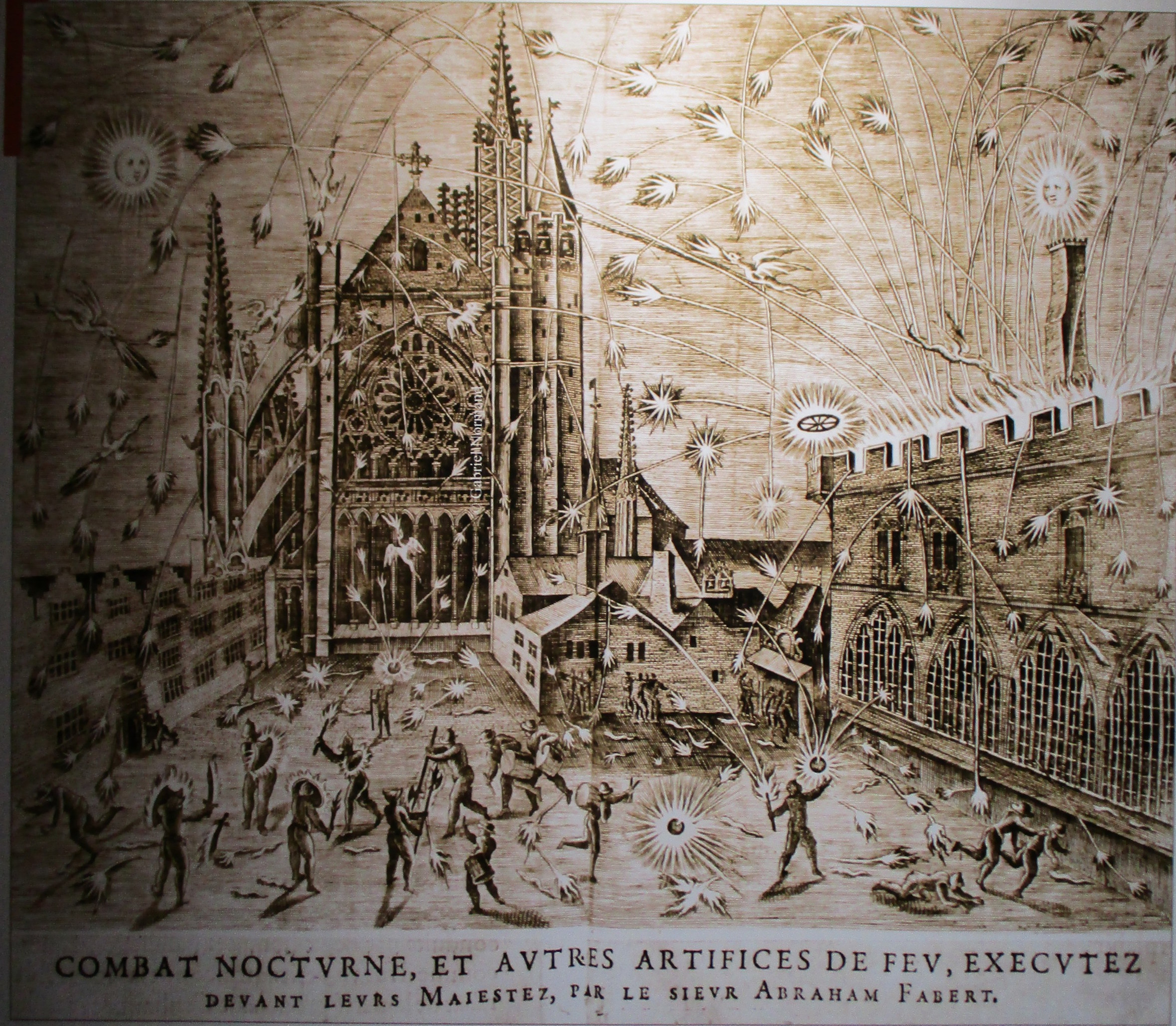
Welcoming King Henry IV to Metz with fireworks – 1603

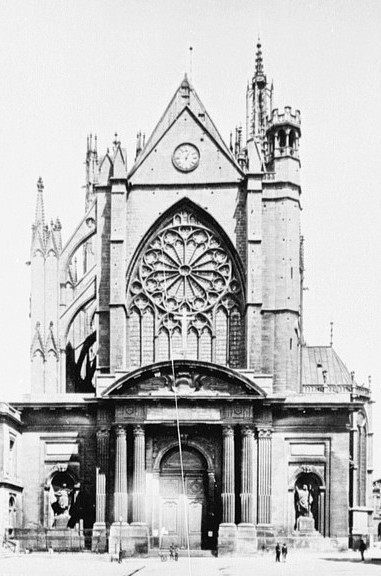
Blondel's classical portal, added in 1766

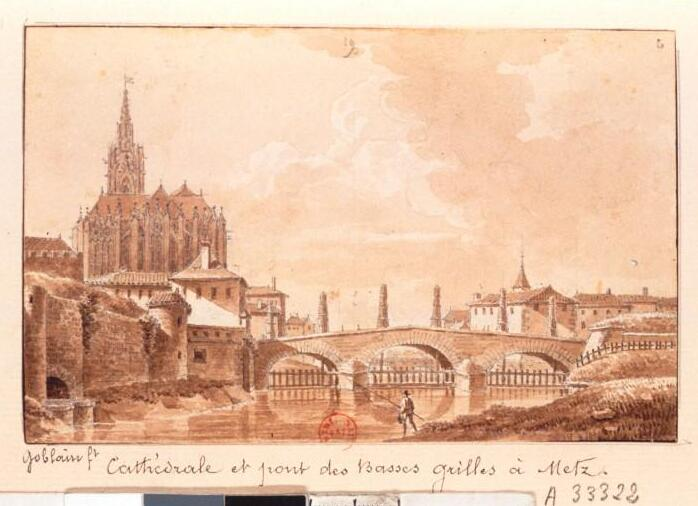
The cathedral in about 1800

Work continued into the 16th century to rebuild the remaining Romanesque portions into the Gothic style. The old choir was demolished in 1503. A few weeks later, the old Romanesque south transept fell. The next year work began on the new transept, and the final flying buttress of the choir was installed in 1506. The new construction largely followed the original Gothic style. A new canonical choir was built beginning in 1519 next to the sanctuary, at the crossing of the transept. An ornate rood screen was installed between the choir and the nave, with sculpture by Mansuy Gauvain, and new choir stalls were installed. The choir was completed with a new altar and a small organ in the triforium above the rood screen. A project was also begun to create a new grand portal on the west end. The work was begun but was halted in 1552 by the entry into the city of the army of King Henry II of France. Work did not resume until 1761.

Metz and the Duchy of Lorraine formally retained their independent status, but the French political and cultural influence grew from 1737 until 1766, when France formally annexed the Duchy. In 1741, proponents of the new French classical style, popular in Paris, proposed to redecorate the choir of Metz Cathedral in the new style. They presented a neoclassical program for the choir by the royal sculptor from Paris, Sébastien Slodtz. However, Slotdtz's proposed decoration was fiercely resisted by the more conservative chapter and was finally rejected in 1762.

In 1754 another large modification was begun by the governor of Metz. He destroyed the old cloisters next to the church, with their chapels and arcades, with the intention of creating a parade ground for official celebrations. However, this project was abandoned in 1758. Instead, the space was filled by a group of houses, shops and a large pavilion.

Another classical addition to the cathedral was proposed in 1755 by the royal architect Jacques-François Blondel. He was commissioned by the Royal Academy of Architecture to build a Neoclassical Doric portico which would serve as the main entrance to the cathedral. This was funded partially by Louis XV, to celebrate his recovery from a serious illness from which he had nearly died in Metz in 1744. It was duly built between 1764 and 1766, However, the work on this new portal caused more problems; it was found that the portico would block some of the stained glass windows, and the digging of the deep foundations for the portico immediately created weaknesses in the west front and north buttress.

=== The Revolution to the 21st century ===
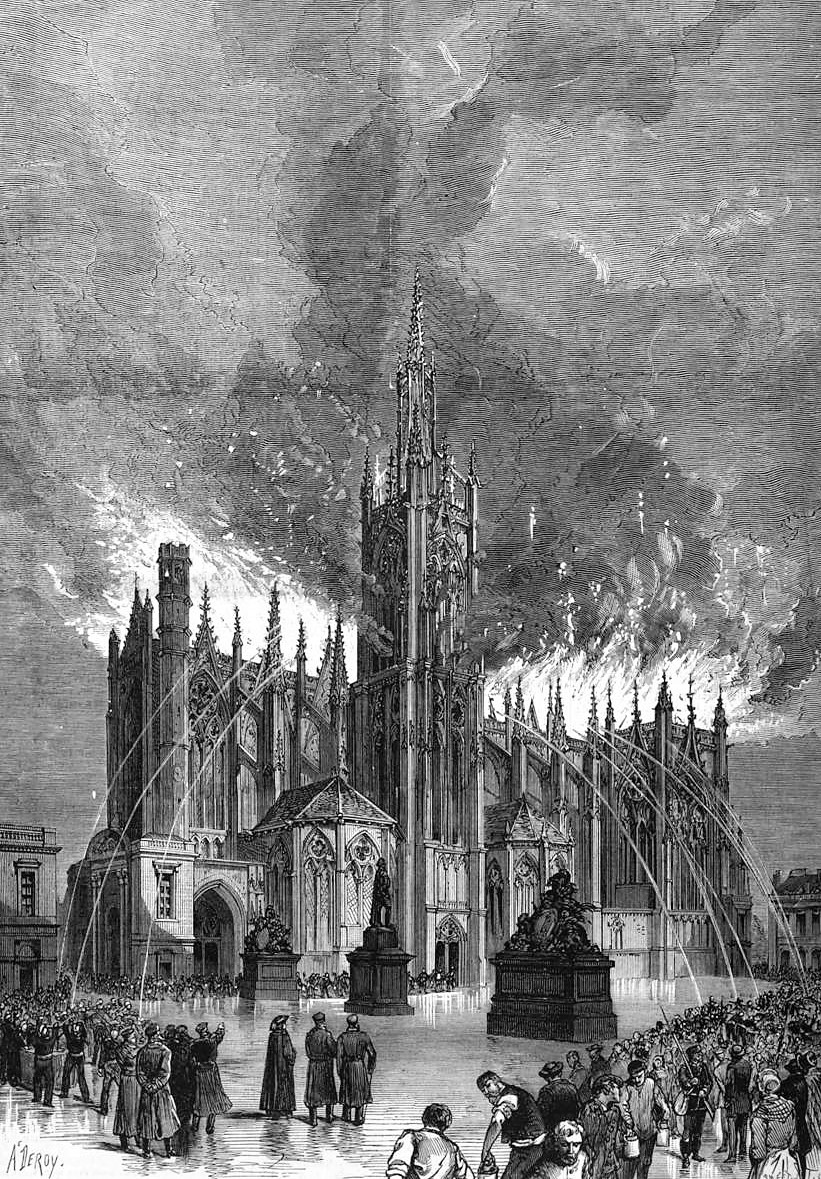
The fire of 1877

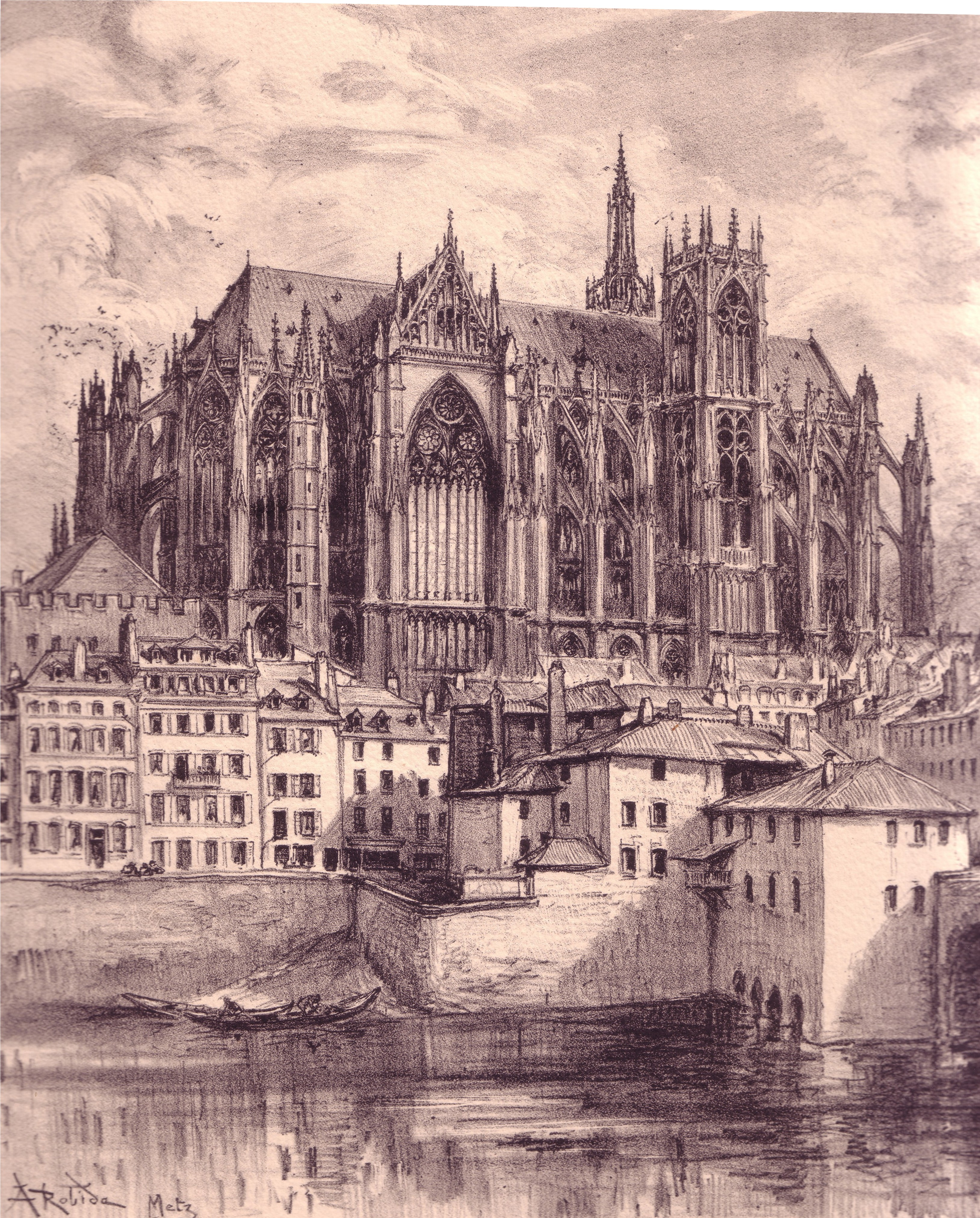
Drawing of the cathedral in 1905 by Albert Robida

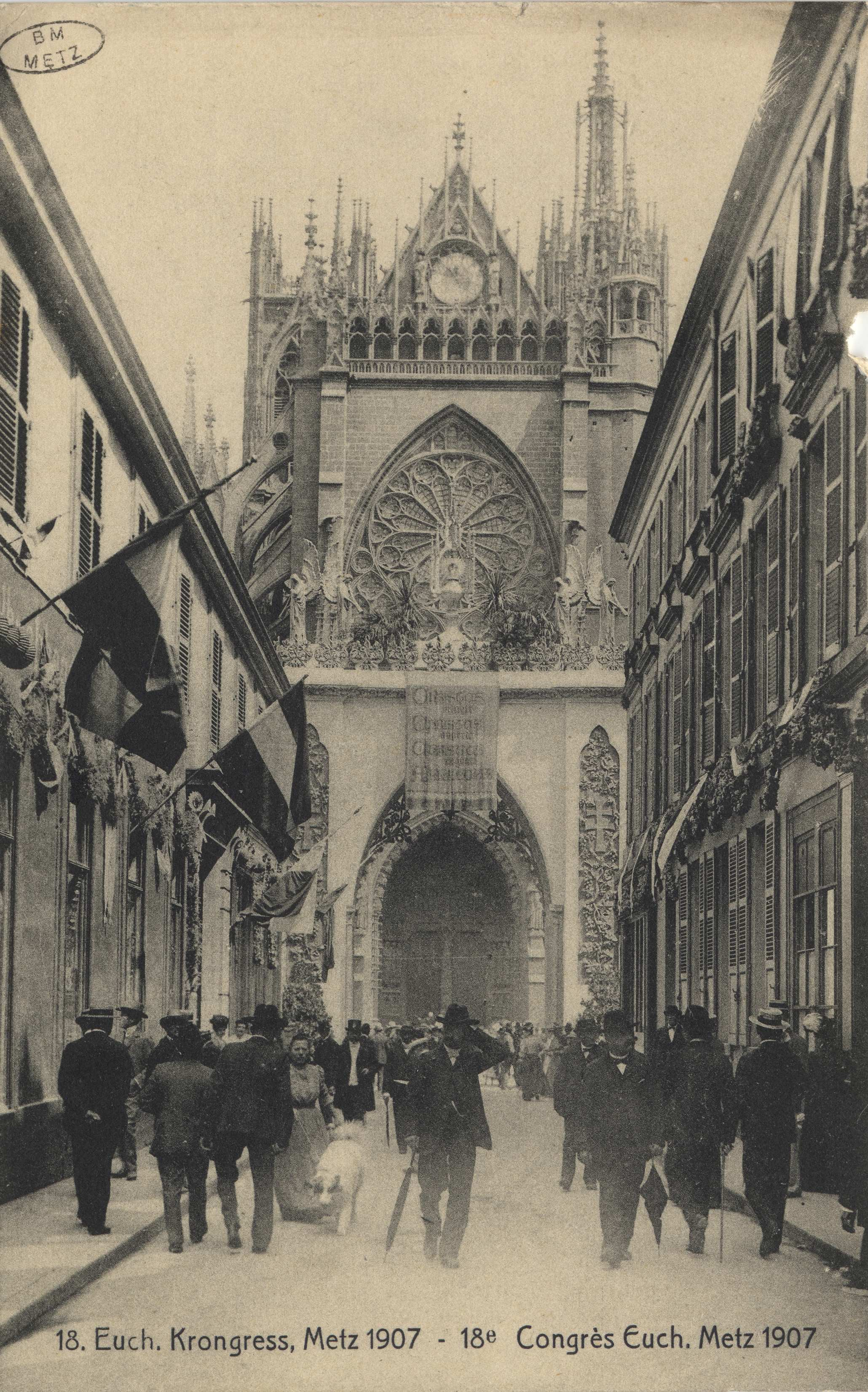
The cathedral in 1907 with the new portal and decorated gable

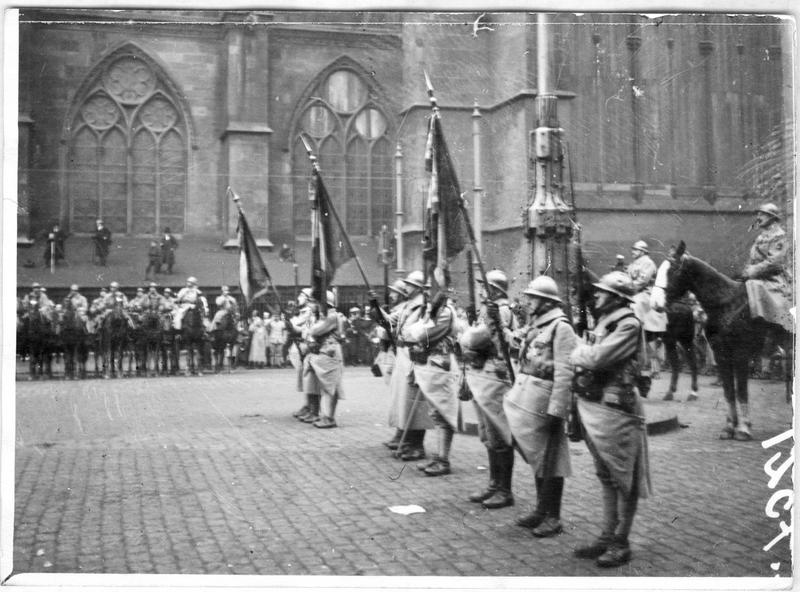
The troops of Maréchal Foch parade past the cathedral (1918)

In the years before the French Revolution in 1789, many of the Gothic tombs and monuments of the cathedral were removed, or put into lower aisles to accommodate the new classical taste. The Revolution greatly accelerated the destruction. The cathedral chapter was formally abolished in 1790, and the cathedral was declared a simple parish and episcopal church. The old rood screen, made in 1555, was destroyed and replaced by a circular platform or stage in the transept. From 1793 to 1794, the cathedral was officially termed a "Temple of Reason". It was turned into a legal church in 1795, and services resumed, but it was not formally returned to the Catholic Church until 1802.

The cathedral was in a deplorable state in the early 19th century. The vaults shook when the bells in the tower rang. The arch supporting the right side of the bell tower was broken, and the windows of the tower had to be removed. The arch was finally replaced in 1829. Weaknesses of the foundation made the new portico unsteady. The wood of the belfry of the Chapter tower was rotting, and falling in pieces onto the street below; workmen refused to enter the unstable tower. The government finally agreed to finance the complete reconstruction of the tower of La Mutte, which was completed in 1843. The government of Emperor Louis-Napoleon promised a full restoration of the cathedral.

Following the Prussian victory in the Franco-Prussian War of 1870, Lorraine and Metz were taken from France in 1871 and annexed to the new German Empire. In 1877, the cathedral was heavily damaged by a major fire caused by fireworks. The King of Prussia and Emperor William I took a particular interest in the rebuilding of Metz Cathedral, to win the support of the population.

Cathedral all en volute (vaults), where the wind sings as in a flute, and then responds the Mutte, the great voice of the Good Lord!

— Paul Verlaine, Ode to Metz, Invectives, 1896.

A young architect from Munich, Paul Tornow, became master of works of the cathedral in 1874 and held the position for thirty-two years, until 1906. He first constructed a new roof, built on a metal frame, which raised its height by 3.5 meters. He then removed the collection of structures that had been built up against the walls, and restored the Chapel of Notre-Dame-de-Mont-Carmel, which had previously belonged to the adjoining church of Notre-Dame-la-Rond. He reopened the windows which had been blocked by the 19th-century construction. He also cleared out the crypt of the cathedral, which had been turned into a storeroom for the neighbouring shops in the gallery. Between 1874 and 1877 he restored the vaults and buttresses that had been weakened by age and the fire. Between 1898 and 1903 he removed Blondel's classical portico over the portal.

The new portal was the subject of careful study by Tornow. He decided upon a 14th-century Gothic style, in harmony with the rose window. With the French sculptor Auguste Dujardin, he visited twenty-one cathedrals in Burgundy, the Ile-de-France, Normandy and Champagne, taking photographs to act as the basis for his design. The final plan adapted elements of the 13th and 14th centuries, and borrowed particularly from the portals of Auxerre Cathedral, Chartres Cathedral and Amiens Cathedral. He also rebuilt triangular gables at the top of the north and south facades in the late Gothic style, with spires and pinnacles. The new south portal was completed and inaugurated on 14 May 1903. The final project of the exterior renovation was the La Mutte tower, which was granted back to the church by the city, which had taken it as the municipal bell tower.

Major restoration and rebuilding also took place inside the cathedral, under another architect, Wilhelm Schmitz. He enlarged the choir, restored damaged windows, constructed new choir stalls, and installed a new stone choir screen, new altars, and new bronze doors for the west portal. In 1914 war interrupted the work. In 1918, at the end of the First World War, Lorraine and the cathedral were returned to France. The forty-four new choir stalls, made in Colmar in 1914, were finally installed in 1922.

Between the First and Second World Wars, little funding was available to restore or improve the cathedral; the only significant addition was a new bishop's chair, installed in 1932. However, after the Second World War, chief architect Robert Renaud began a campaign to restore and renew the art. He had a copy made and installed of the angel-musician statue which had decorated the roof–it had been blown down in a storm in 1952. In 1965, a stained glass window of David and Bathsheba, designed by Marc Chagall was installed in Bay 9, along with windows by other contemporary artists.

Until 1960 all the furnishings of the cathedral were either original Gothic or recreations of Gothic. That year the cathedral began to acquire modern works of furniture and art, including windows designed by Marc Chagall, Jacques Villon and other artists.

In 1999 another wind storm broke loose a pinnacle from the roof, which fell through the roof of the sacristy, requiring major work. The west rose window also showed signs of weakness, due to the absence of a supporting buttress on the west, and began to crack. It was reinforced with two steel supports between 1995 and 2000. The La Mutte tower was restored between 2009 and 2015, including the restoration of the bells and their mechanism. The works, funded by the French state at a cost of €5.5 million, made it possible to swing the great bell again after nearly a century of silence; the restored tower was inaugurated on 27 June 2015, when its three bells were rung after the noon strike. ·

=== Timeline of construction ===
- 984 – c. 1040 Construction of an Ottonian basilica over an ancient shrine dedicated to Saint Stephen
- c. 1180 – 1207 Construction of a chapel in Early Gothic style on the west side of the basilica
- c. 1220–1240 Beginning of the construction of the Gothic cathedral within the foundations of the Ottonian basilica, construction of the aisles ·
- 1265–1285 Construction of the triforia and the two bell towers
- 1285 – c. 1290 Elevation of the westwork within the foundations of a Gothic chapel from the 12th century
- 1290s Construction of the vaults of the nave and the supporting flying buttresses
- c. 1300–1330s Construction of the Lady Chapel
- 1380 Junction between the former Gothic chapel and the nave
- 1384 Creation of the stained glass tympanum of the west facade and the rose window by master glass maker Hermann von Münster
- 1478–1483 Elevation of the spire
- 1486–1490s Construction of the northern transept
- 1504 Creation of the stained glass tympanum of the northern transept by master glass maker Theobald of Lixheim
- c. 1490–1500s Construction of the Gothic choir and east end
- 1504–1520s Construction of the southern transept
- 1518–1539 Stained glass by master glass maker Valentin Bousch, including the tympanum on the southern transept
- 1761–1764 Neoclassical refurbishment conducted by Jacques-François Blondel
- c.1850–1880s Destruction of the ornaments of Jacques-François Blondel
- 1889–1903 Construction of a Neogothic portal on the west front
- 1965–1967 Stained glass windows of Marc Chagall

Pope John Paul II celebrated Mass in the cathedral on 10 October 1988, during his apostolic journey to France.

Pope Pope Leo XIV celebrated Mass in the cathedral on 28 September 2026, during his apostolic journey to France.

== Exterior ==
Metz Cathedral is a Rayonnant Gothic edifice built of the local yellow Jaumont limestone. As in French Gothic architecture, the building is compact, with slight projection of the transepts and subsidiary chapels. However, it displays singular, distinctive characteristics in both its ground plan and architecture compared to most other cathedrals. Because of the topography of the Moselle valley in Metz, the common west–east axis of the ground plan could not be applied and the church is oriented north-northeast. Moreover, unlike the French and German Gothic cathedrals having three portals surmounted by a rose window and two large towers, this one has a single porch at its western front. The entrance is to the side of the building through another portal placed at the south-western side of the narthex, avoiding the usual alignment of the entrance with the choir.

The nave is supported by flying buttresses and culminates at 41.41 metres (135.9 ft) high, making it one of the highest naves in the world. The height of the nave is contrasted by the relatively low height of the aisles at 14.3 metres (47 ft) high, reinforcing the sensation of height of the nave. This feature permitted the architects to create large, tall expanses of stained glass. Throughout its history the cathedral has been subjected to architectural and ornamental modifications with successive additions of Neoclassical and Neogothic elements.

=== West Front and the Portal of Christ ===
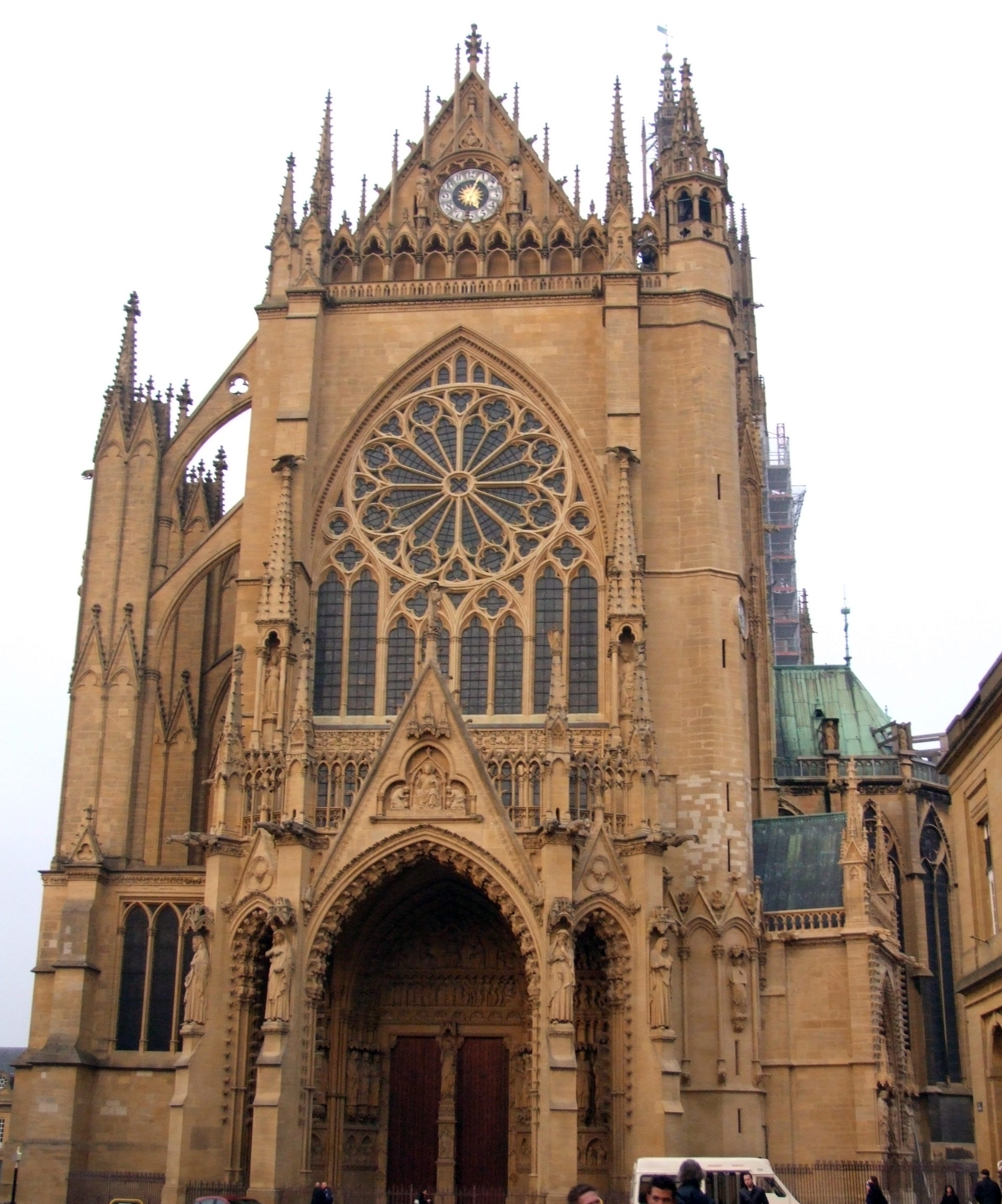
West Front – the Portal of Christ, Horloge tower on right

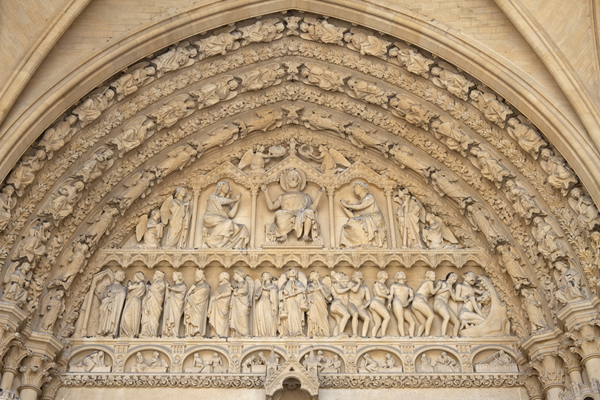
Tympanum of the Portal of Christ

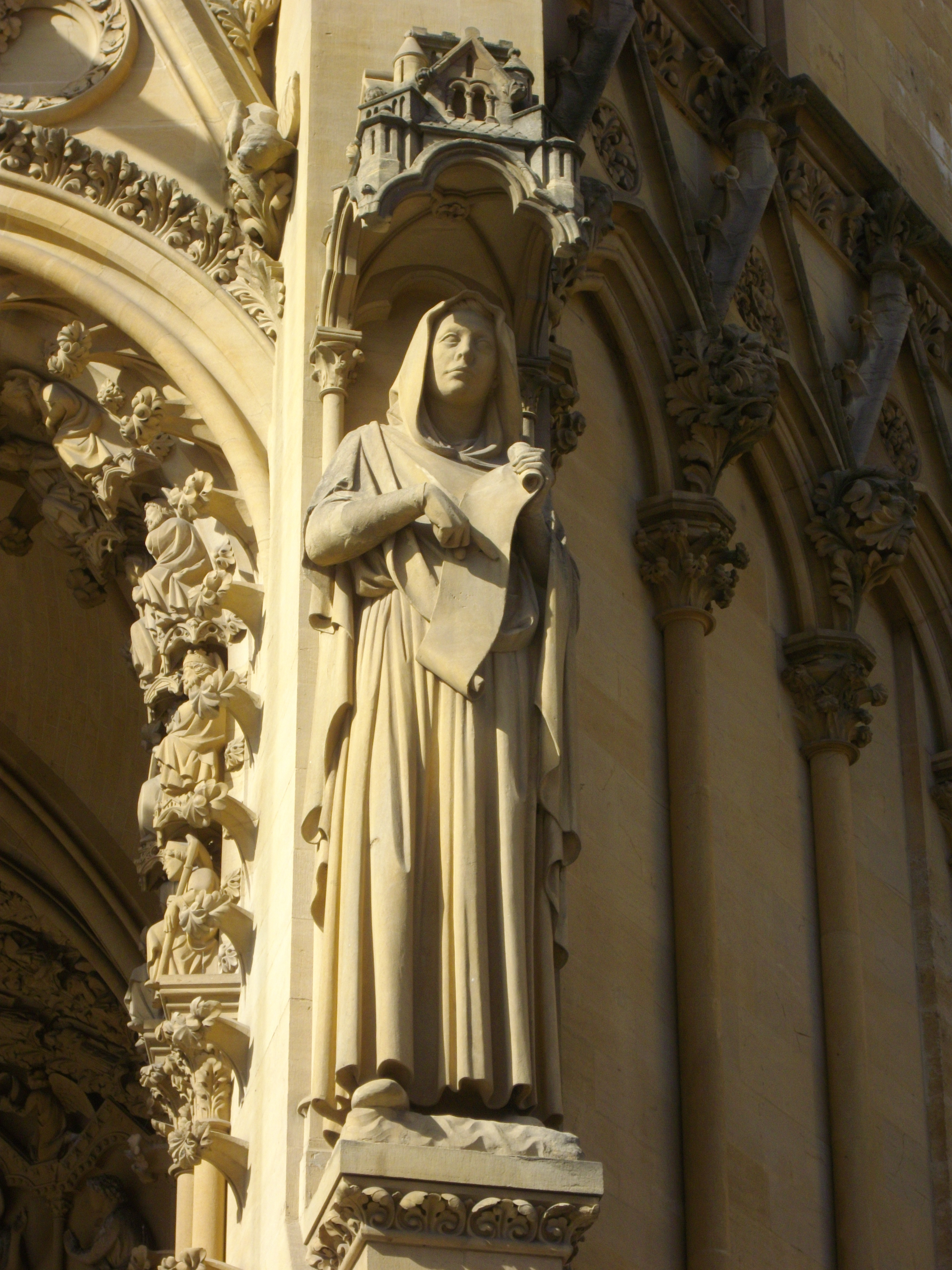
Statue of Saint Daniel, originally modelled after William II of Germany

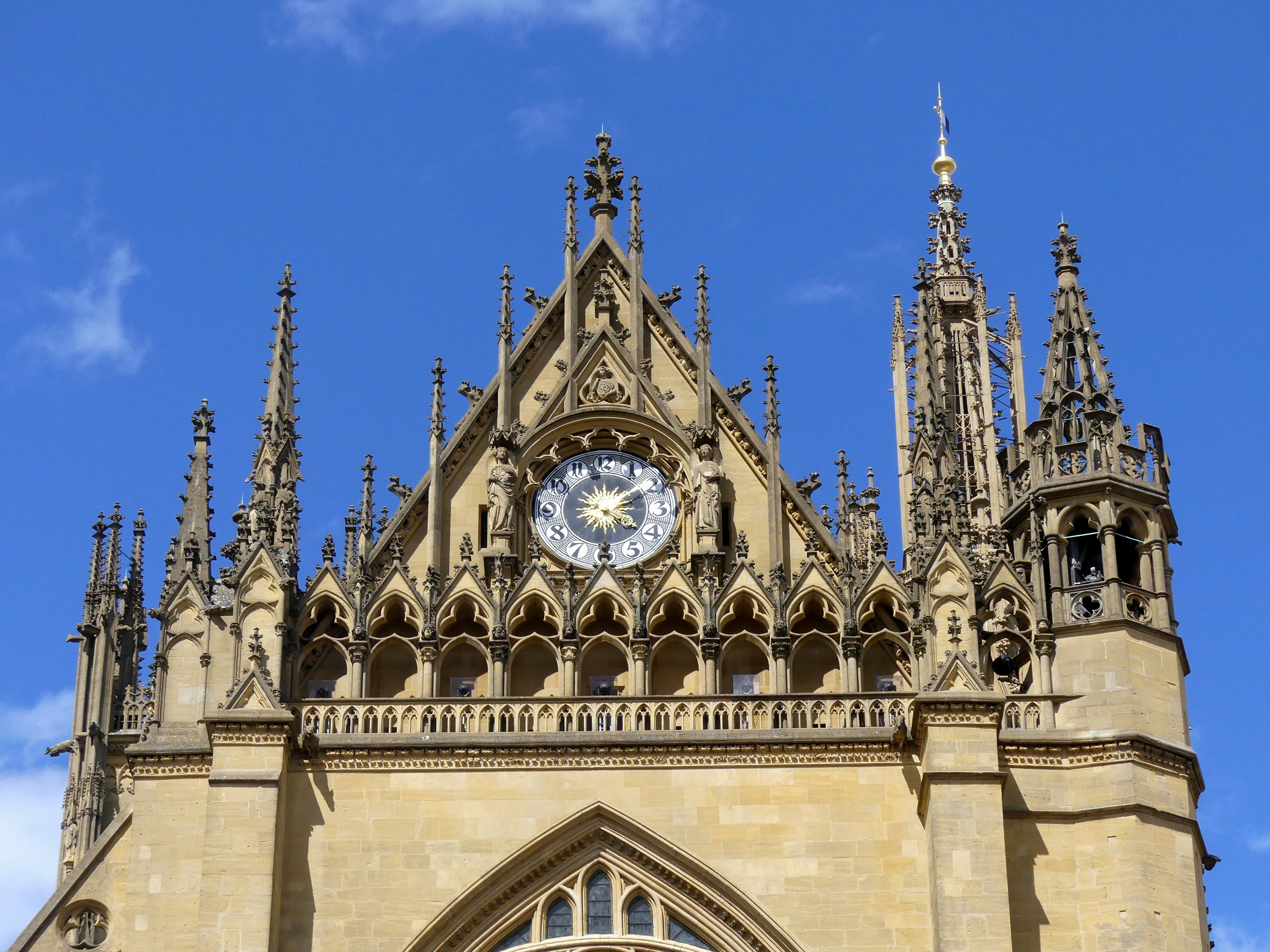
Top of the west facade

The portal of the west front, typically the main entrance of a cathedral, in Metz is a secondary entrance. The original Gothic portal was replaced by a classical entrance in 1764, which was replaced by the current Neo-Gothic portal in 1903, called "Christ the King." It was designed by architect Paul Tornow and artist Auguste Dujardin. It is lavishly filled with sculpture including column-statues in niches above smaller sculptures in the soubassement. The tympanum over the portal, largely inspired by the Tympanum of Amiens Cathedral, illustrates the Last Judgement, with Christ as the central figure, between two figures representing the Church the Synagogue. The portal is flanked by four 4-meter-tall statues of the prophets Isaiah, Jeremiah, Ezekiel and Daniel. The statue of Daniel was originally given the features of the German Emperor of the time, William II, who commissioned the Portal before the First World War. The moustaches were removed during the German occupation of Metz in World War II.

=== Portal of the Virgin ===
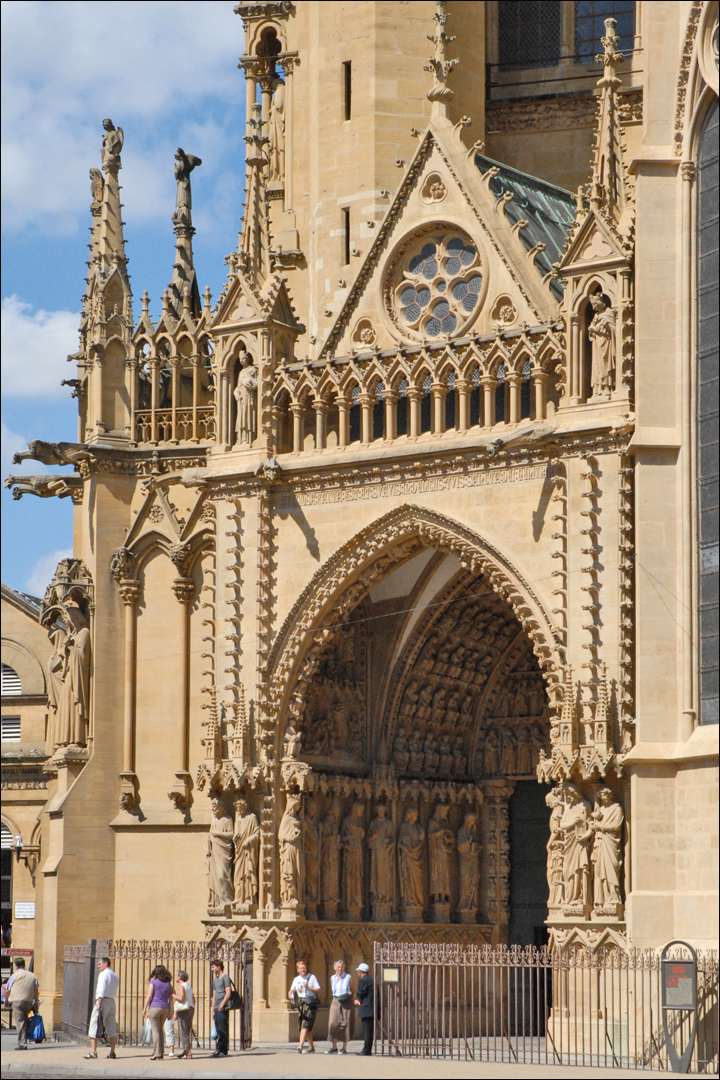
South side - Portal of the Virgin Mary

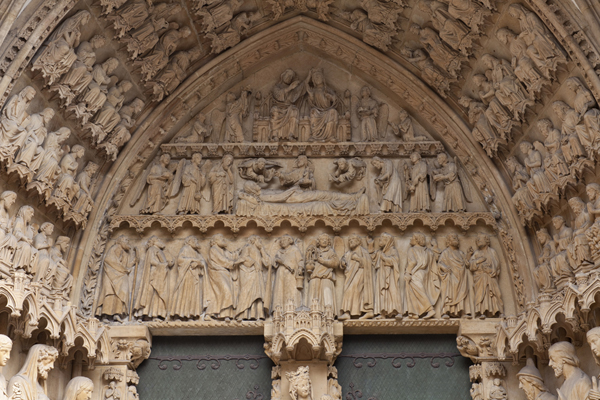
Tympanum of the Portal of the Virgin

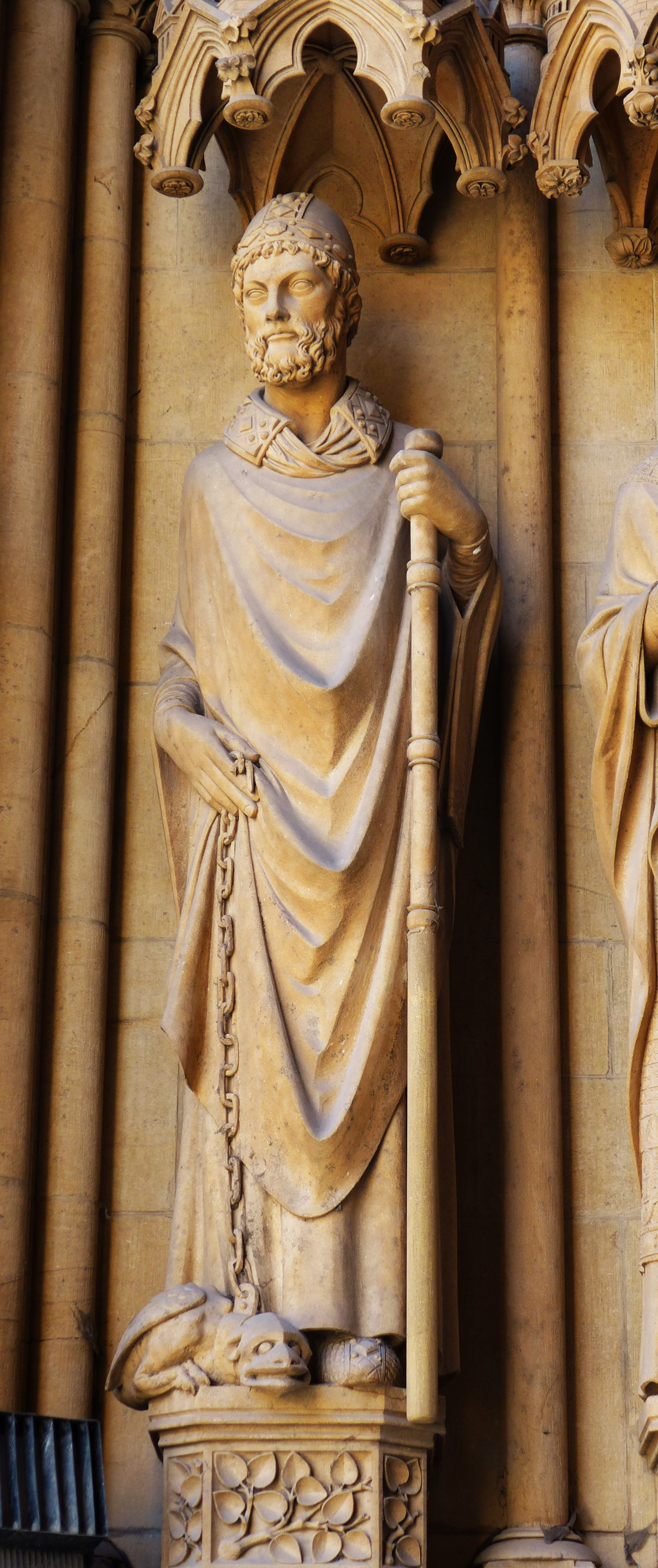
Statue of Saint Clement on the Portal of the Virgin

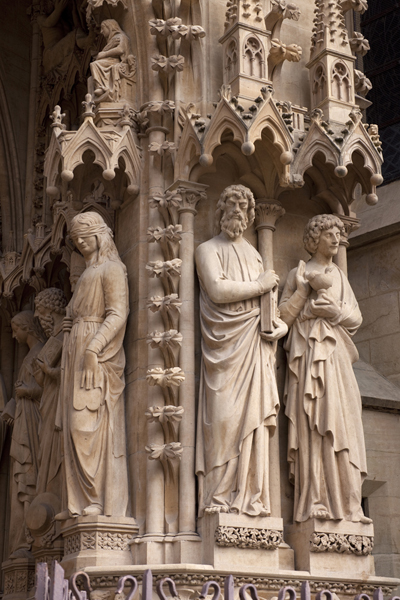
Sculpture of the Portal of the Virgin

The Portal of the Virgin, in the south side facing the Place d'Armes, was constructed before 1225. It was the main entrance of the cathedral until the 18th century, and it most probably occupied the same place as the entrance of the earlier pre-Romanesque cathedral. It was covered over and seriously degraded during the addition of classical features in the 18th century, and was not uncovered until 1867. It was then lowered by a meter and a half. A majority of the sculpture, was recreated by Auguste Dujardin, and other portions were restored. It was not formally opened until 1885. The sculpture depicts scenes from the life of the Virgin Mary, culminating at the top of the arch with the crowning of the Virgin by Christ. Recent research found traces of orange, red and green pigment, indicating that the original portal sculpture was brightly colored.

=== Portal of Notre-Dame-La-Ronde ===
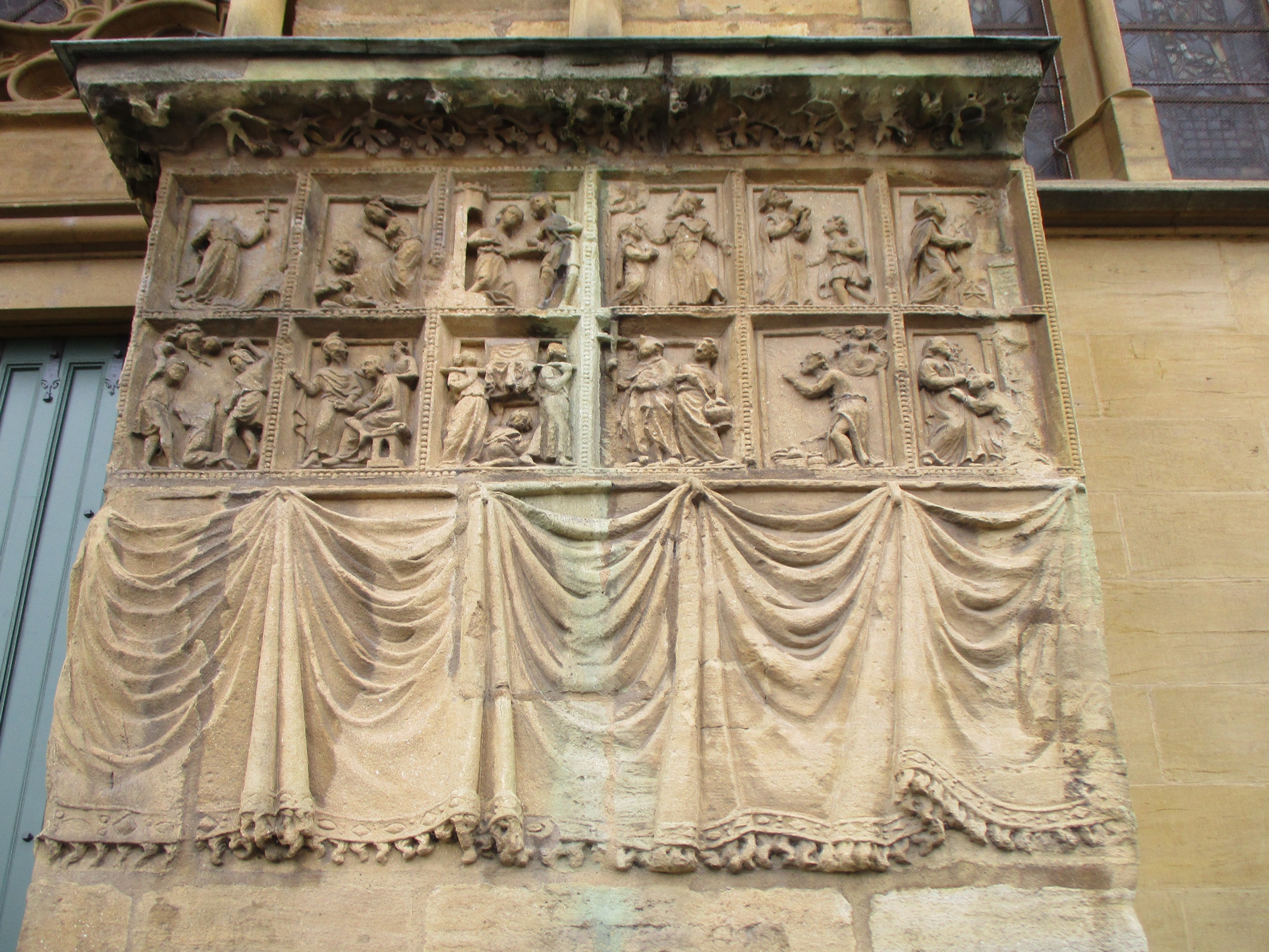
Sculpture around the portal

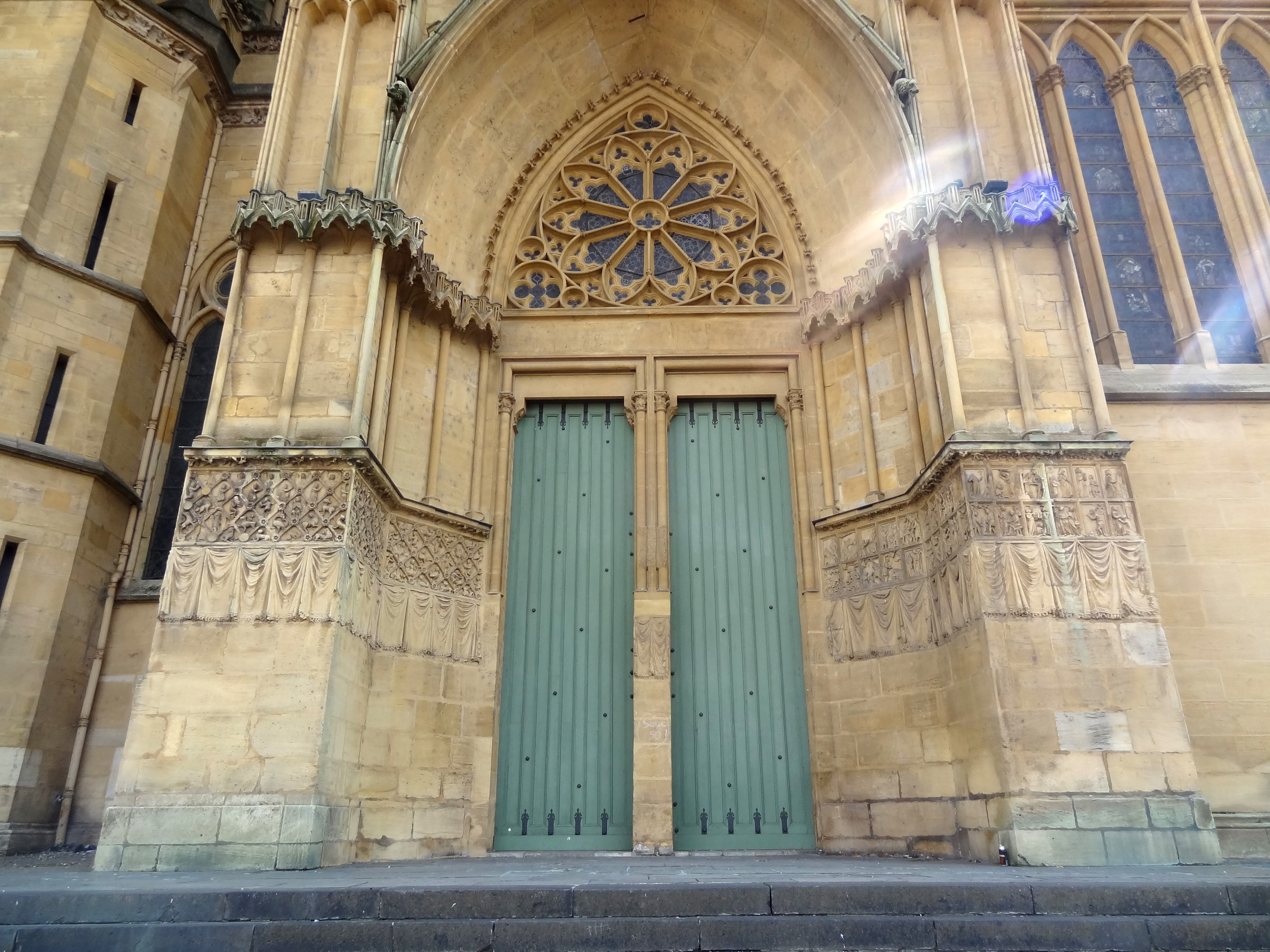
Portal of Notre-Dame-La-Ronde

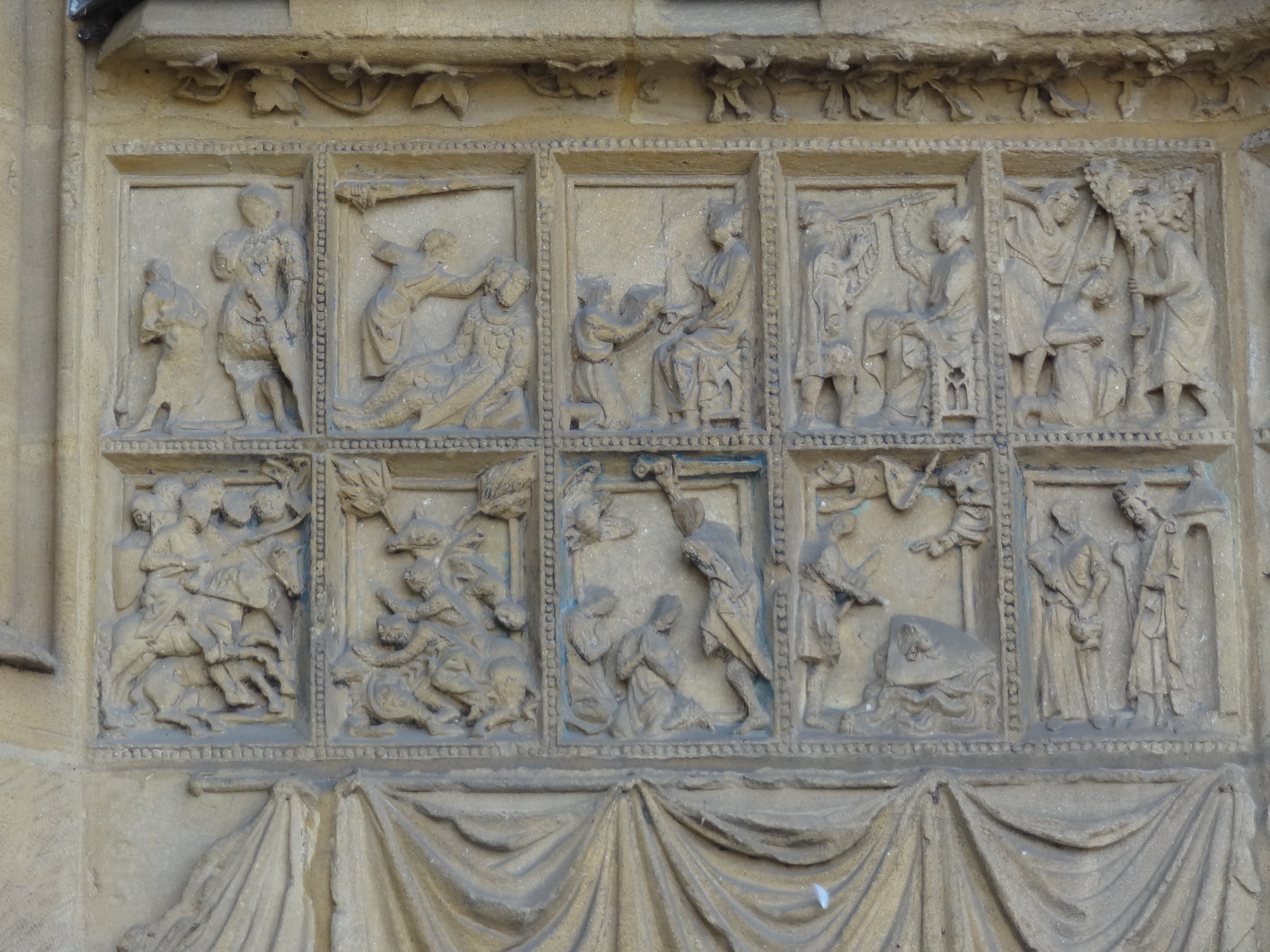
13th-century sculpture around the portal; The story of David and Goliath (above) and the martyrdom of Saint Maurice (bottom)

The Portal of Notre-Dame-La-Ronde, on the northwest side, dates to 1260–65 and is the oldest and most simply decorated entry to the cathedral. In the 18th century, it was given a classical canopy to harmonise with the other classical features, but it still retains panels of the 13th-century sculpture and carved stonework resembling fabric around the doorway. Similar design from the same period is found at Reims Cathedral.

=== Bell Tower of La Mutte, Chapter Tower and Horloge Tower ===
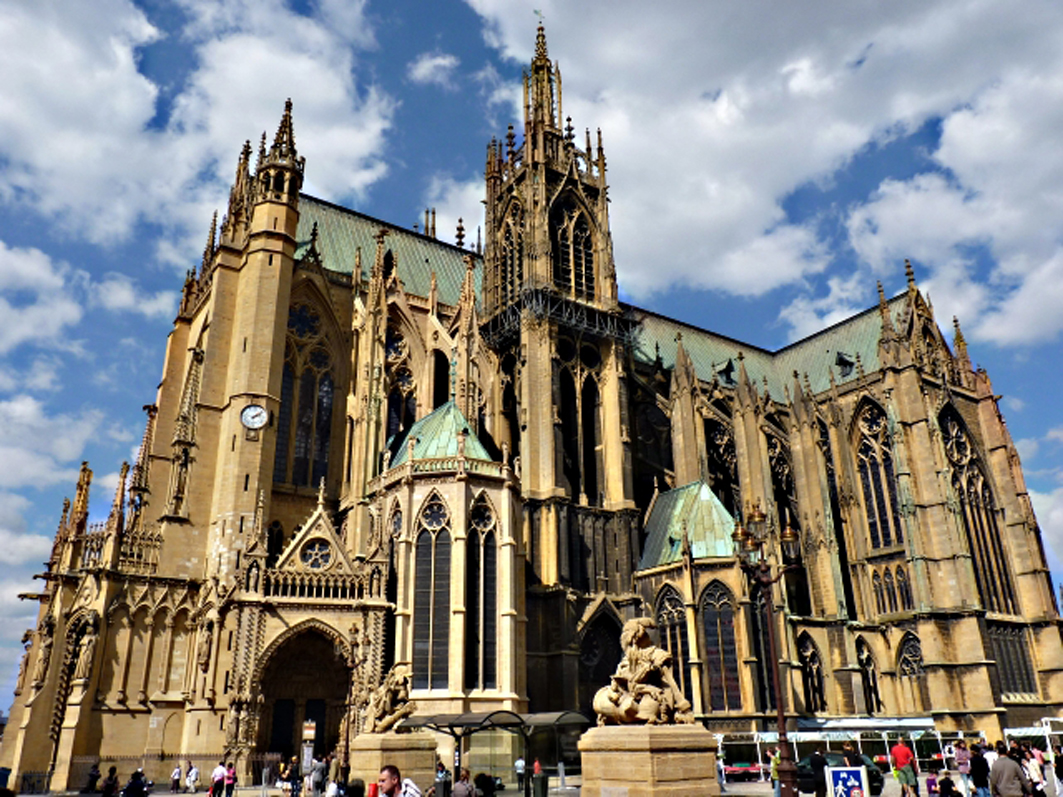
La Mutte tower (center) and Horloge tower (left)

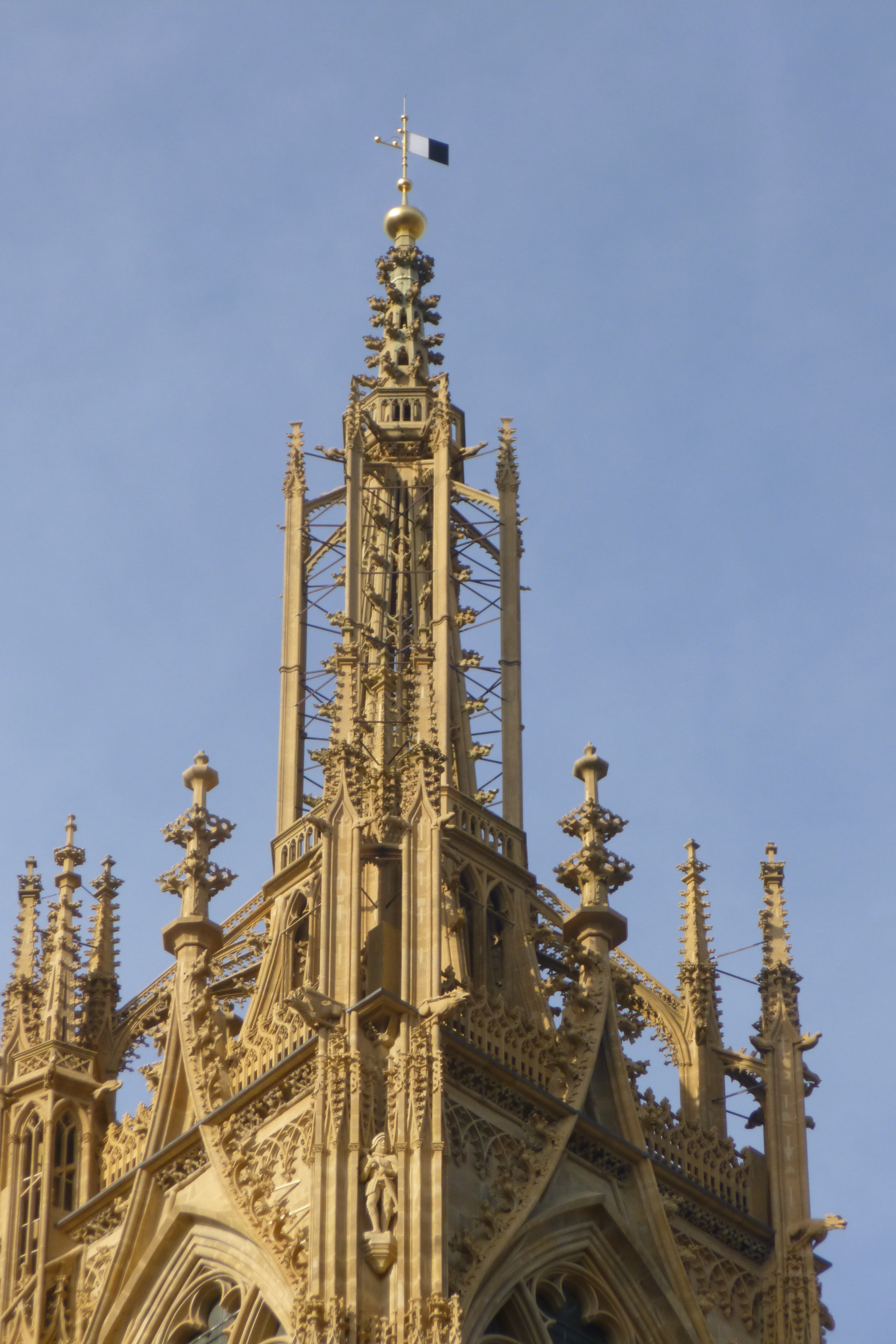
Top of the La Mutte tower

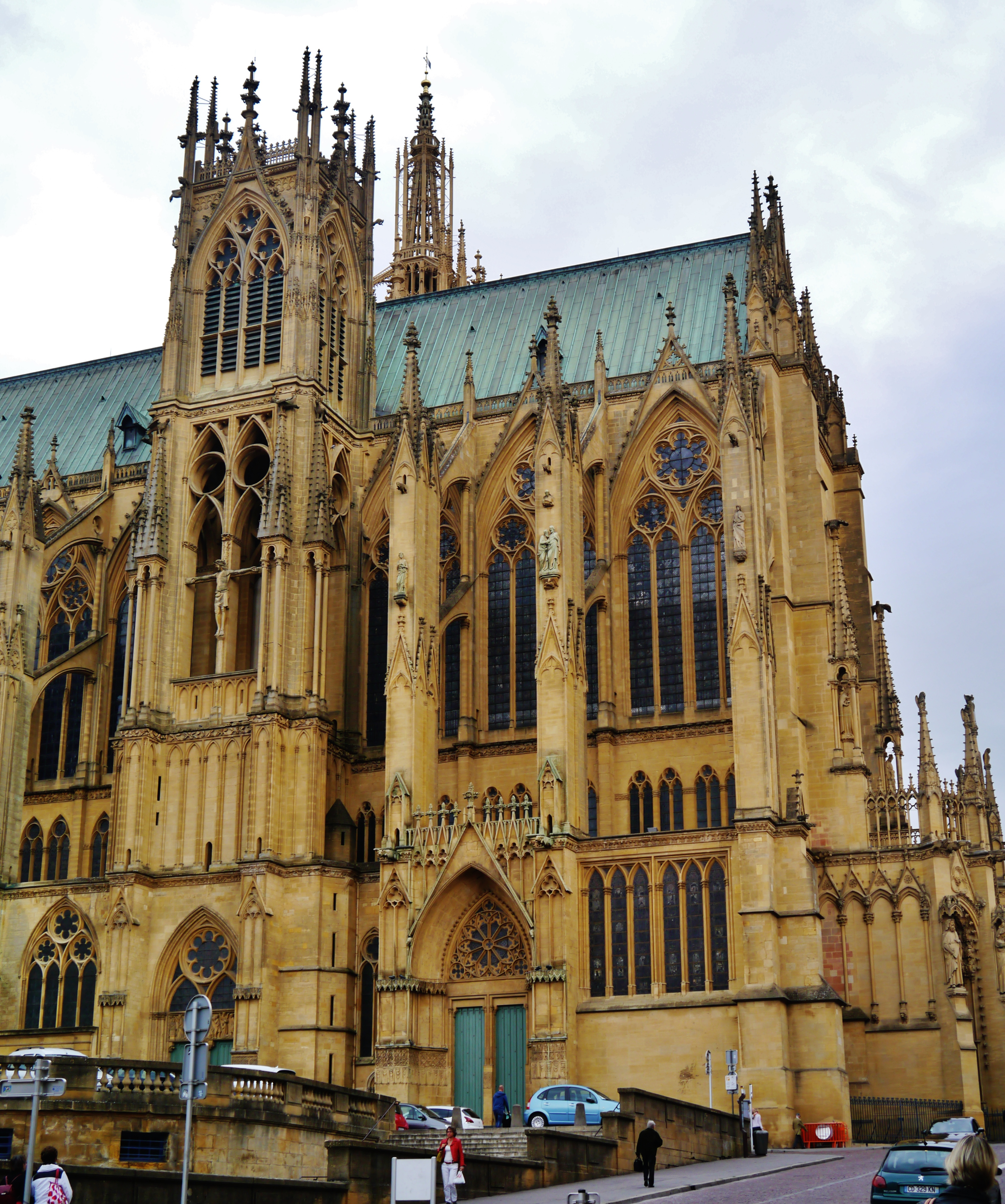
The Chapter Tower

The south tower of the cathedral, called "La Mutte", was both the cathedral and municipal bell tower; it was built in 1324 and the municipal bell, called La Mutte, was installed there in 1381. This bell was rung in case of fires, approaching enemies or important civic events. After a fire in 1468, a new upper stage of the tower and a spire was constructed on top. It has two platforms where watchmen were posted to look out for fires or approaching enemies. The tower stands 88 metres (289 ft) high.

The present major city bell in the tower is named "La Mutte" and was cast in 1605. It weighs 11,000 kilograms (24,250 pounds). A second bell, called Tocsin, made in 1501, weighs 1500 kilos, and is rung to signal the end of the day; along with a third small bell, called Mademoiselle de Tourmel, made in 1802 and recast in 1875. It weighs just 45 kilograms.

The Chapter Tower (Tour de Chapitre), was built at the same time, at the end of the 14th and beginning of the 15th century, and in the same style and plan as the tower of La Mutte. This tower also contains a portal to the cathedral, the Portal of St. Stephen. The medieval sculpture was nearly all destroyed by the end of the 18th century, with the exception of a scene on the lintel of the stoning of Saint Stephen, and two scenes from the life of St. Clement. A new bell, named Paul after the patron saint of the cathedral chapter, was donated by Renaud Bartylla for the jubilee marking the 800th anniversary of the cathedral. Blessed on 26 December 2019, it was hoisted by crane into the belfry of the Chapter Tower on 29 July 2020, joining the five bells already there; it weighs 501 kg and sounds C sharp. ·

The west front of the cathedral receives support from a massive buttress on the north, while on the south the facade gets support from the Tower of the Horloge, an eight-sided tower, more slender and shorter than the tower of La Mutte, whose lower portion, with sections of white stone, probably belonged to the original collegiate built in 1207. It is capped by an octagonal belfry and an open pyramid, which were added in 1896. The exterior of this tower features an angel holding a sundial, decorated with the coat of arms of the city, and the date 1504. This tower formally belonged to the city of Metz, and contains a second set of cathedral bells. The largest bell, which sounds the hours, was made in 1413, and weighs 2000 kilograms; a smaller bell sounds the quarter hours, and was made 1398 (60 kilograms); and there is a third bell from the 16th century (also weighing 60 kilograms).

=== Transept ===
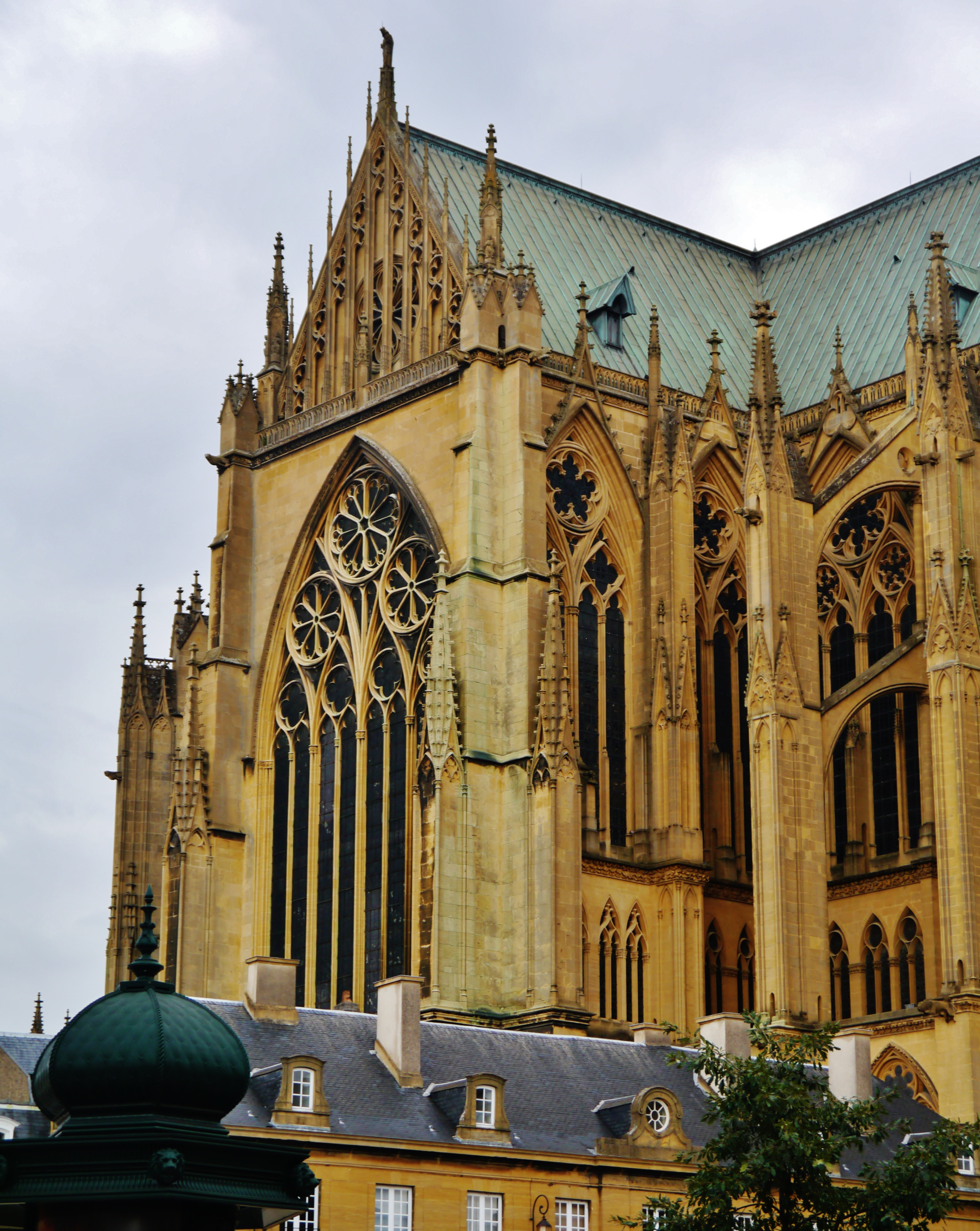
Flamboyant facade of the north transept

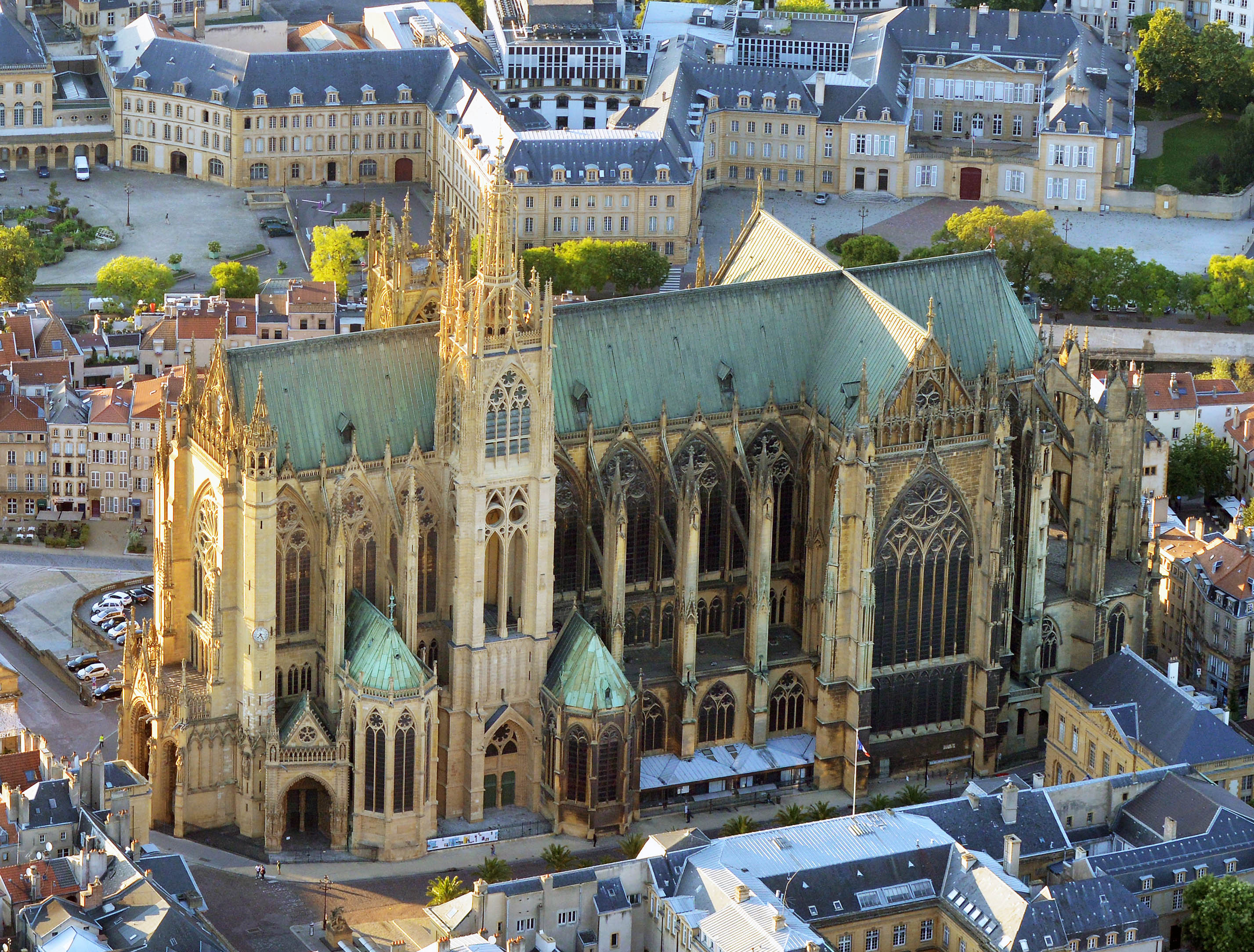
The cathedral from the south, with transept to the right

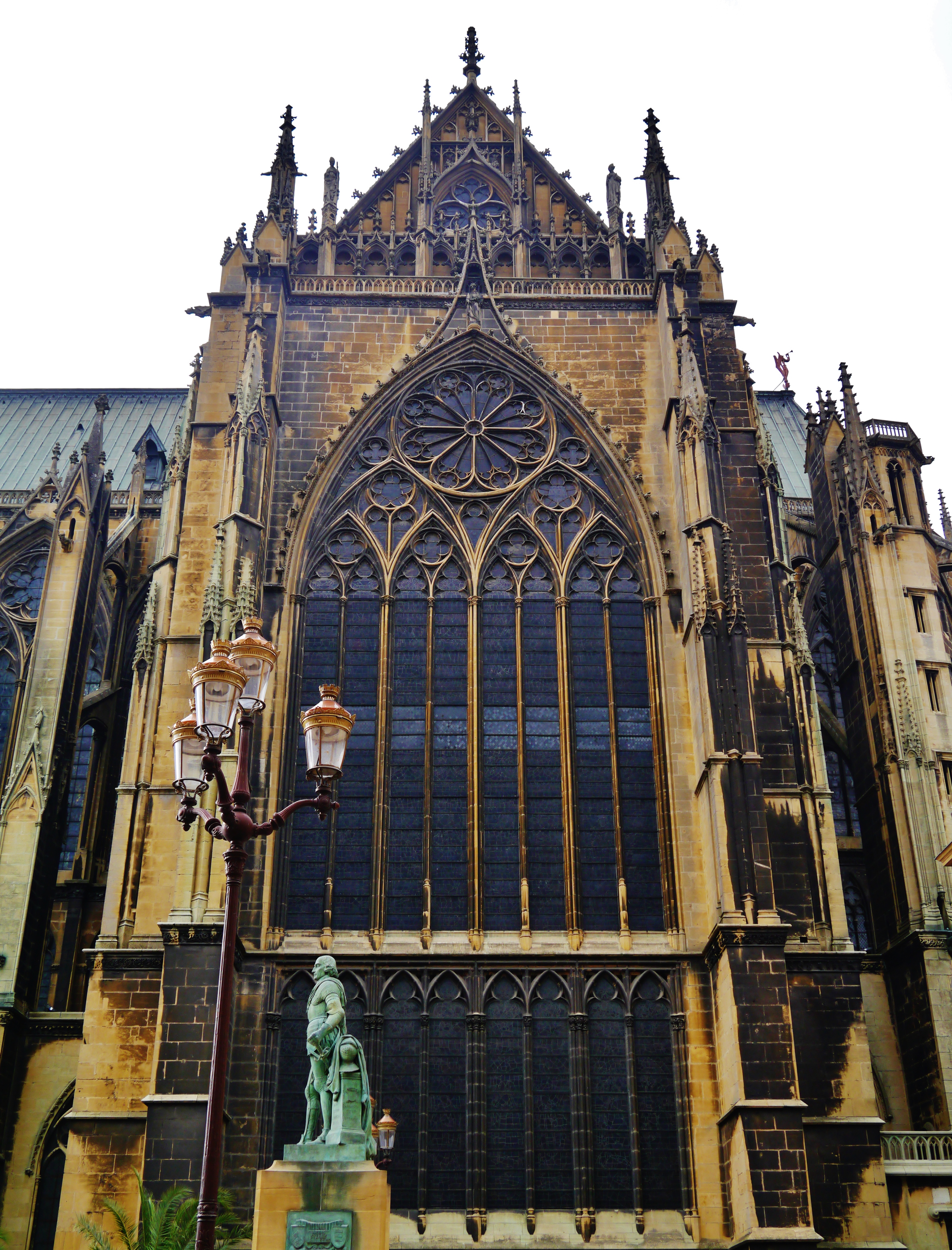
Facade with great window of the south transept

The transept and the chevet were built later than the nave, between 1487 and 1520. In this part of the cathedral, the vaults reach a height of 45 meters. The triangular north transept gable was a later addition of Neo-Gothic, made in 1886 in the 15th-century style. It is crowned with a statue of the Virgin Mary, marking the chapel of the Virgin. The south transept facade has a matching gable made in 1883–85, in the more ornate flamboyant style. It is crowned by two statues, Saint Nicholas and a local medieval bishop, Saint Goëry. There is also a flamboyant gable over the large south window, also an elaborate flamboyant style, with curves and counter-curves. It was damaged by the 19th-century fire and was replaced. At the top is a statue of Saint Stephen, the patron saint of the cathedral.

=== Chevet ===
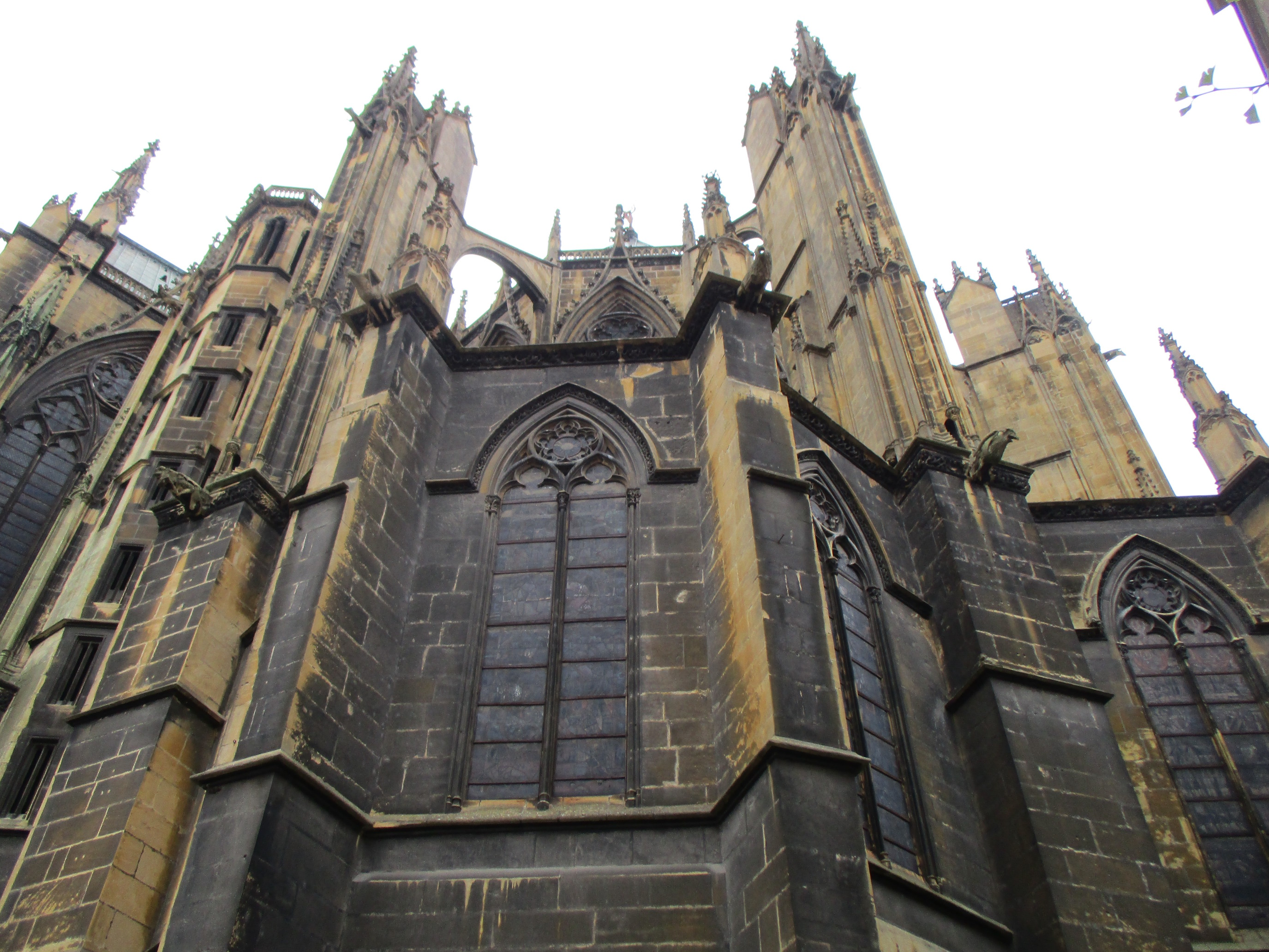
Towers and chapel windows of the chevet

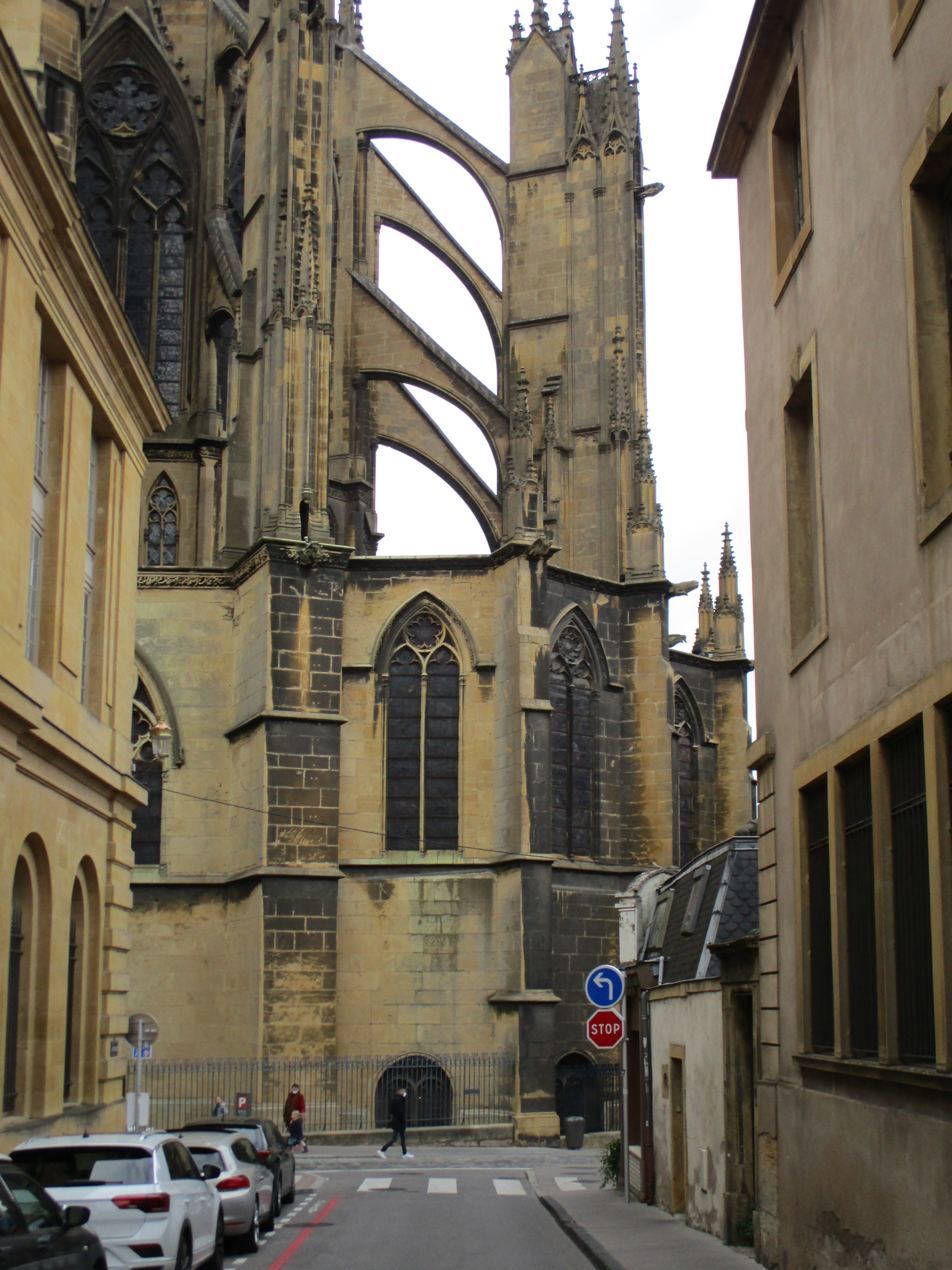
Buttresses that support the high wall of the chevet

The chevet, at the southeast end of the cathedral, was built between 1503 and 1508 atop the earlier Romanesque crypt and the earlier Rayonnant style chapels. It contains the apse and disambulatory, and three radiating chapels; the axis chapel of the Virgin; and chapels of the Sacred Heart and Notre-Dame of Mount-Carmel. The doorway to Rue du Vivier was added in 1889.

The chapels are separated by the massive buttresses and arches which support the upper walls. The buttresses themselves are decorated with spires, which give them extra weight. The windows of the upper walls are topped with pointed arches and pinnacles, and the chevet is flanked by two additional slender towers with spires on either side of the choir, which give additional support to the structure. On the north is the Tower of the Boule d'Or or Tower of the Pomme d'Or (Named for a gilded copper apple ornament on top of the spire before the Revolution); and to south, the Tower of Charlemagne. This tower has a stairway that gives access to the terraces, triforium, and the narrow pathway around the edge of the roof of the choir.

== Interior ==
=== Nave ===
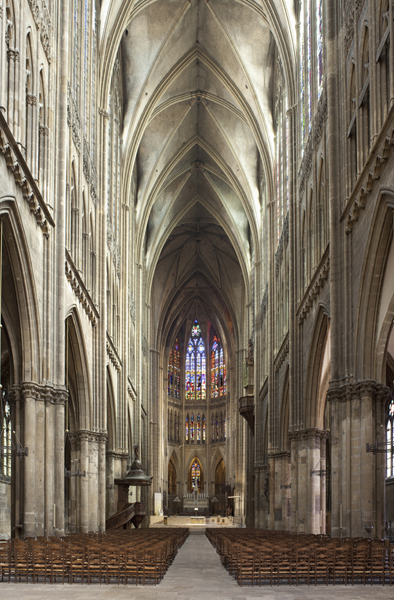
The nave, looking toward the choir

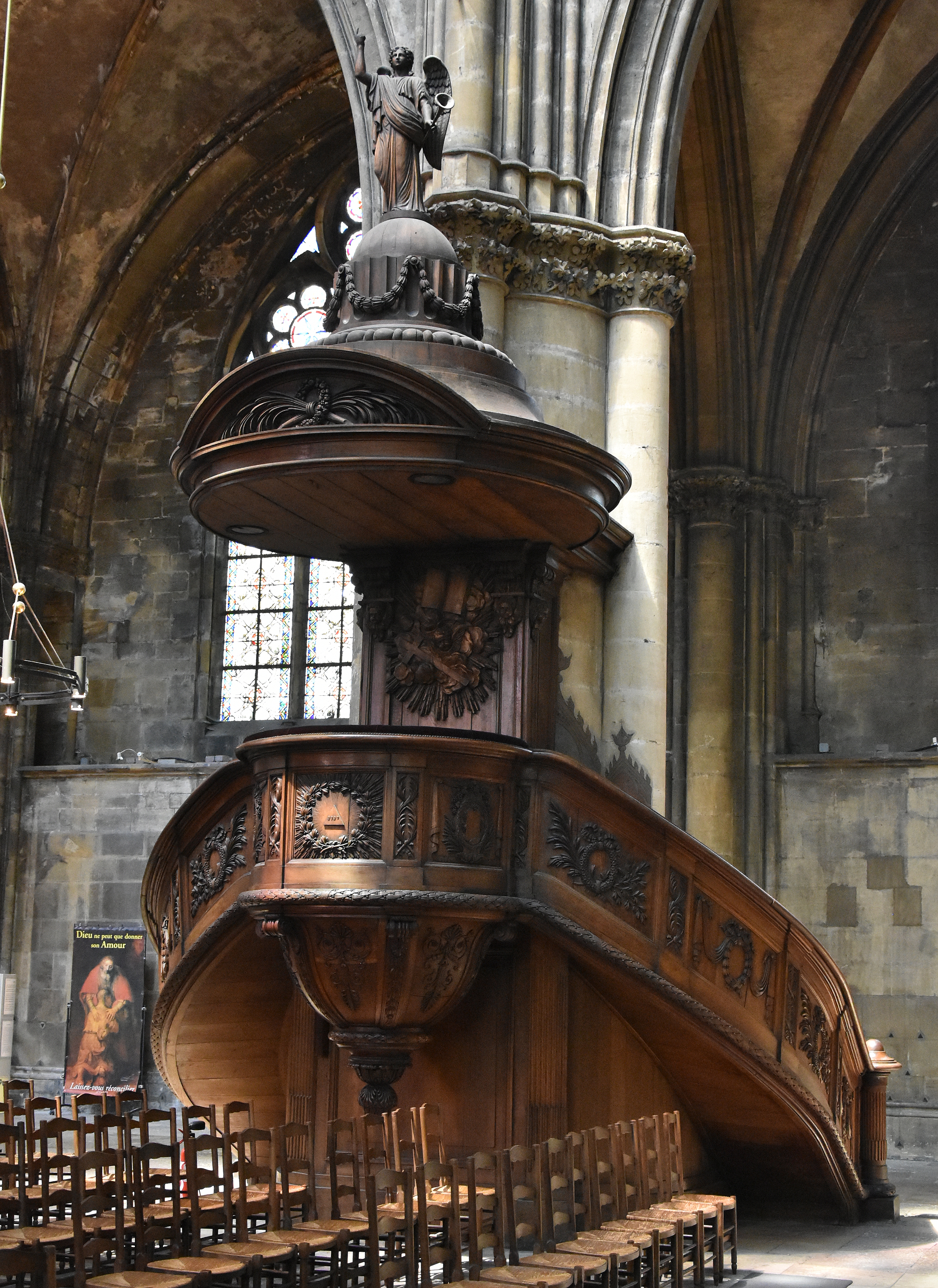
The pulpit in the nave

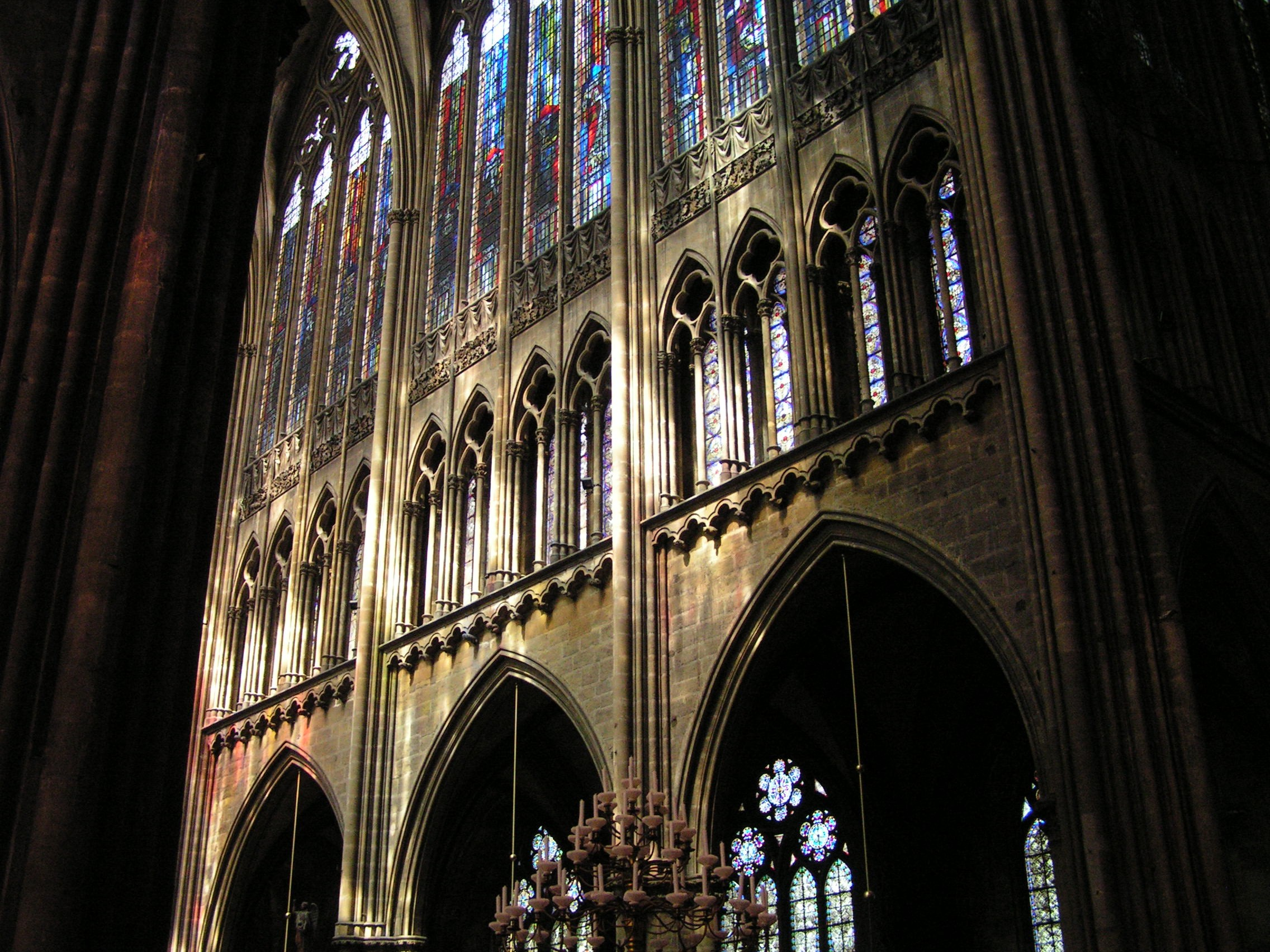
The three-part elevation of the nave

The nave is the portion of a cathedral, usually at the west end, where the worshippers are seated. The nave of Metz Cathedral is noted for its exceptional height, harmony, and especially the great quantity of stained glass that entirely fills the upper walls, the largest area of glass of any cathedral. It has the traditional elevation of Gothic cathedrals of the 13th century, with three levels; an arcade of pointed arches supported by large pillars on the ground floor, 12.65 meters high; above that a triforium with windows, six meters high; above that a decorative band of two friezes with sculpted foliage and drapery; and above that the high windows extending upwards 25.5 meters into the vaults. Slender colonnettes run up the walls between the windows from the arcade pillars to support the vaults. The pillars of the arcade, consisting of bundled columns, also have decoration; sculpted grapevines and other vegetal designs, from about 1245.

The four-part rib vaults of the nave vaults are exceptionally high; between 41.2 and 42.6 meters, exceeded in height only by those of Beauvais Cathedral (48 meters), matching those of Amiens Cathedral (42.3. meters), and taller than those of Reims Cathedral (38 meters). The collateral aisles on either side of the nave are not nearly as high; just 13.3 meters, but they also have walls largely filled with stained glass.

=== Transept and choir ===
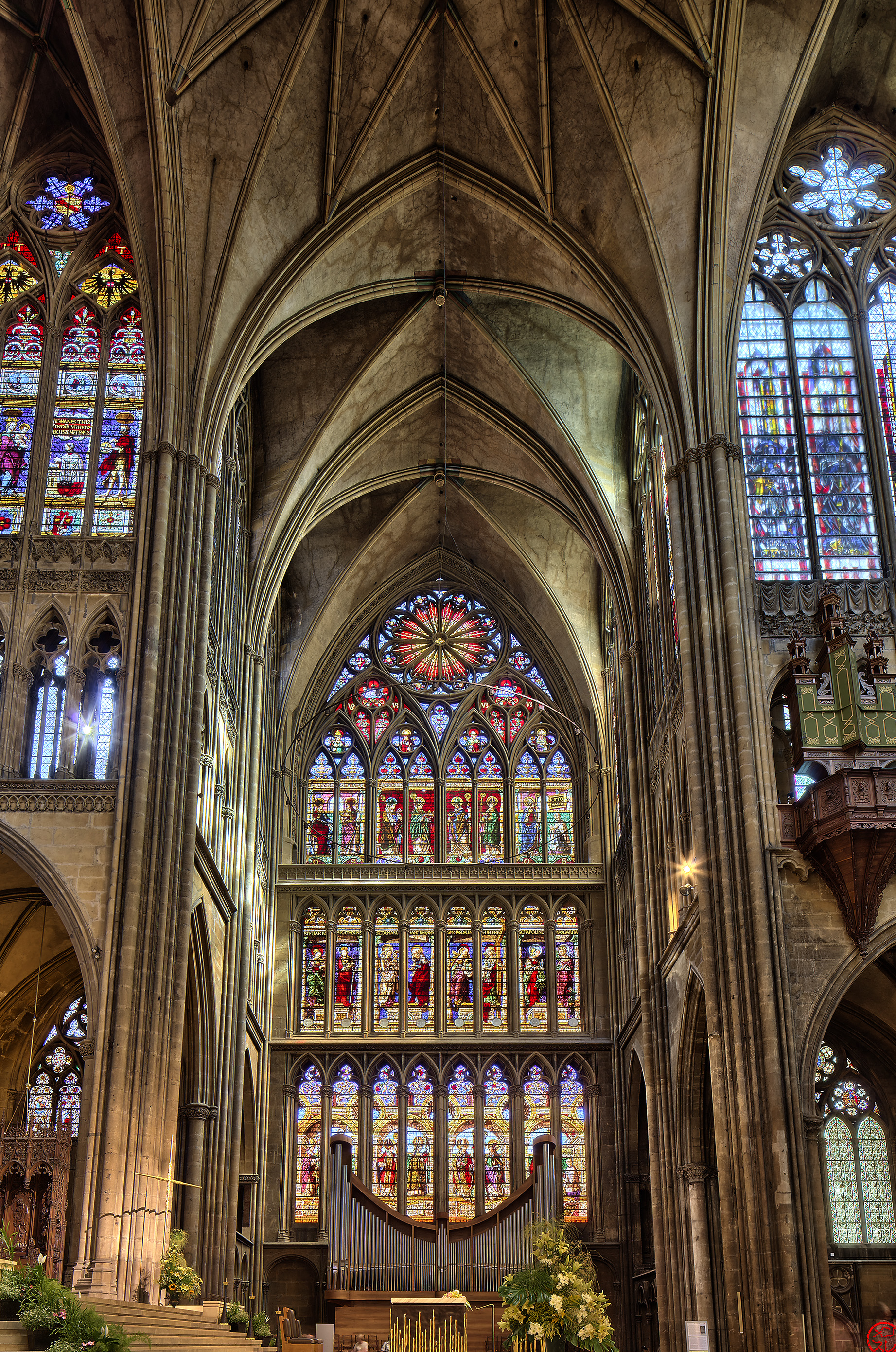
The south transept, with the organ below

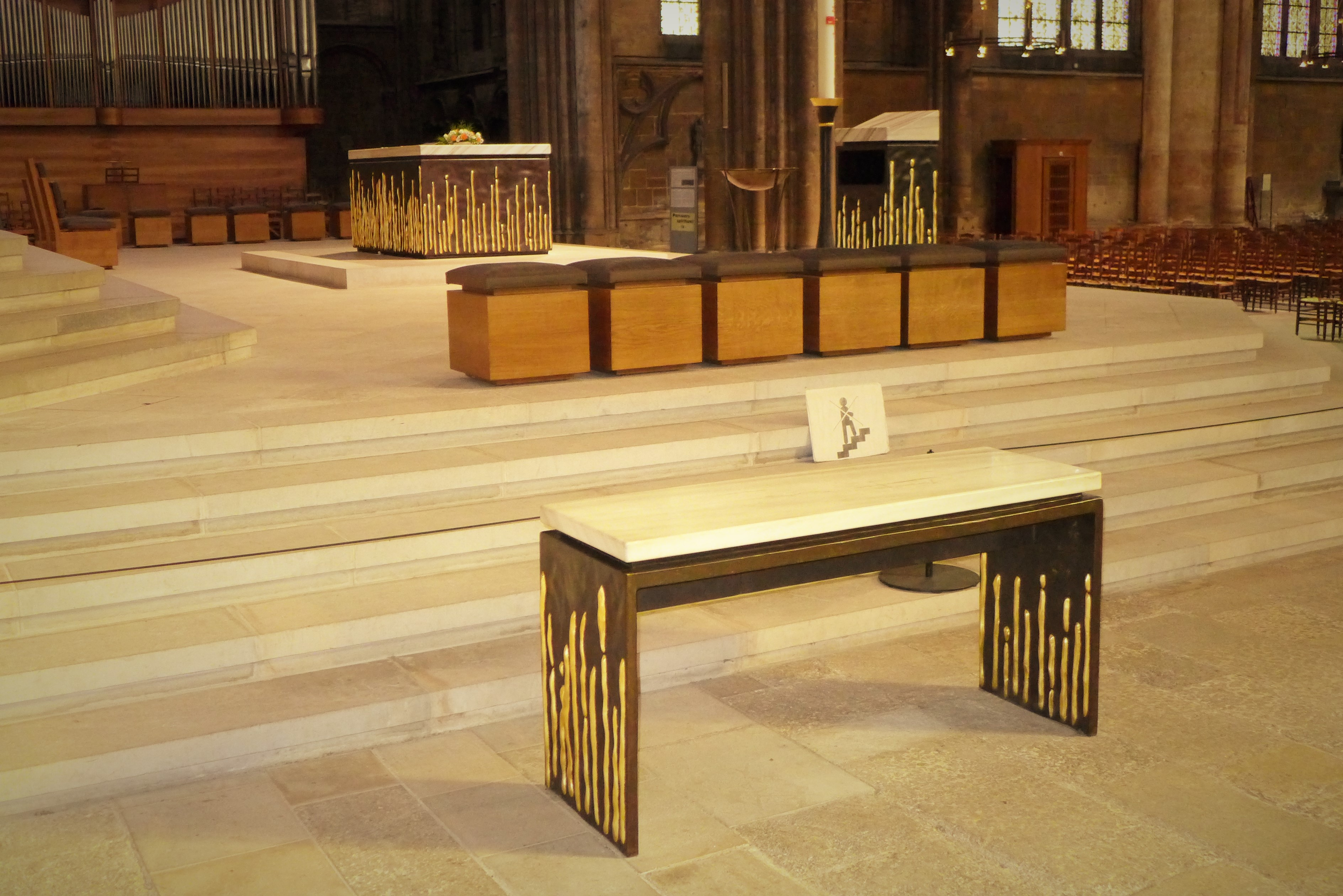
The modern furnishings in the choir by Mattia Bonetti

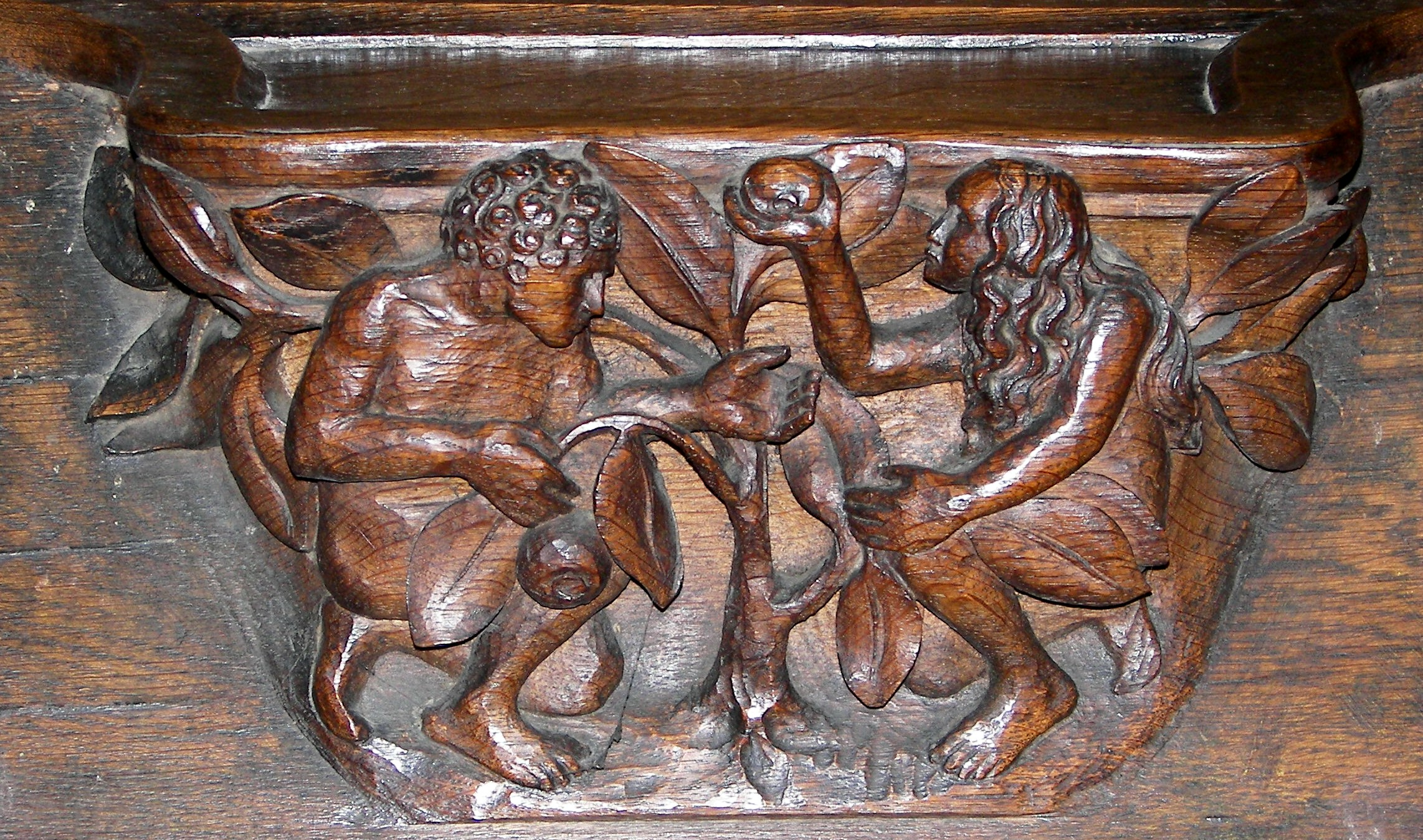
Detail at the choir stalls (1912)

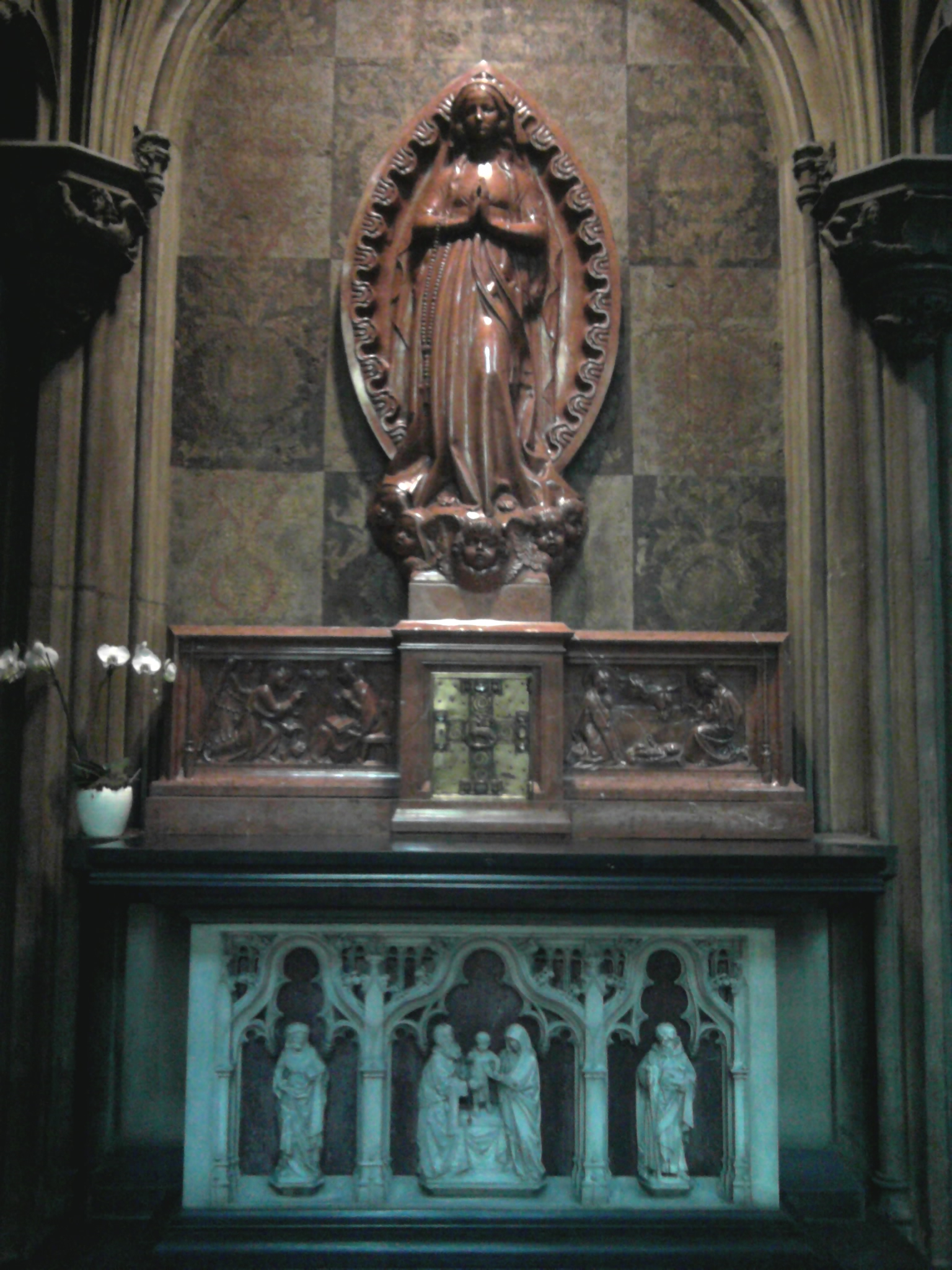
The red marble statue of the Virgin of Lourdes on the lateral altar of the transept

The transept and choir were built later than the nave, between 1487 and 1520, with elaborate decoration in the flamboyant style of the late Gothic in the tracery of the windows and the pillars. Nonetheless, the builders respected the elevations and distribution of space on the walls established in the nave at the end of the 13th century. The high windows of the nave were the model for the high windows in the transept and the choir.

Parts of the north transept also serve an important structural purpose; the section of the transept where it meets the nave, made about 1300, also serves as a buttress for the arches of the nave where they meet the transept. Each level of the transept also has narrow coursières, or passageways, built in the wall on the interior and exterior of the transept.

The vaults of the transept meet the vaults of the nave and choir at the central crossing. The transept is 46.80 metres (153.5 ft) high and 16.34 metres (53.6 ft) wide. The vault in the center of the crossing has additional decorative lierne and tiercon ribs, which form a star, and a large keystone, 1.7 meters high and 3.7 meters across, at the meeting point.

The choir of a cathedral, where the clergy traditionally worships, is usually long, but because of the unusual topography under the cathedral, the choir in Metz is relatively short, and raised up by twelve steps from the transept.

The modern liturgical furniture in the choir was created by the Swiss-born French artist Mattia Bonetti between 2004 and 2006. It includes an altar, Ambon or tribune, and cathedre, or bishop's chair. They are made of bronze, marble and oak, with a motif of reeds gently blowing in the wind, against a dark background.

The Altar of Notre Dame de Lourdes made of red marble in 1911 by the Munich sculptor Max Heilmaler. It was subject to many later alterations. It depicts the Virgin in a red marble mandorle. The additional sculpture of the Announciation, also by Heilmaler. Below the altar a depiction of Christ being presented at the Temple, by Caspar Weis.

With it is the retable made of gilded and painted oak, It was originally made for the altar of a chapel at the shrine of Notre Dame de Lourdes, where it was placed in 1245. It depicts the Virgin, with the moon at her feet, with figures of Saint Barbara and Saint Catherine. It was removed from that church in 1912 because the church authorities in Lourdes felt it clashed with the simplicity of the decor there.

The choir stalls are a prominent feature in the centre of the Choir. They were made by Théophile Klem of Colmar between 1913 and 1914, but they were not put into place until 1922–23. Carvings also decorate the screen of the choir made in 1912.

=== Apse, disambulatory, and radiating chapels ===
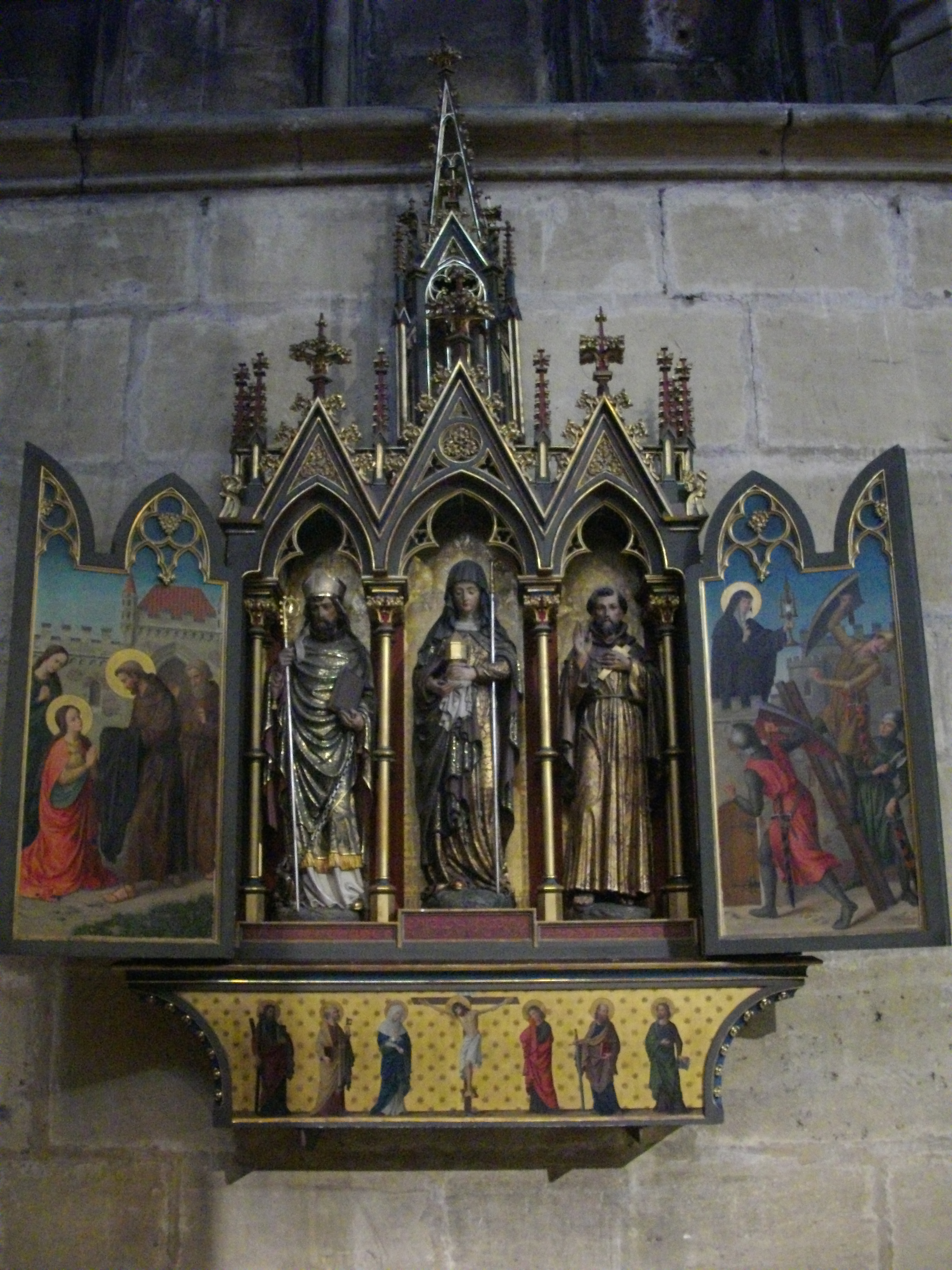
Triptych dedicated to Saint Anne in the disambulatory

Beyond the choir is the apse, with a semicircular passage, the disambulatory, which leads to the three chapels at the end of the cathedral. The central chapel is dedicated to the Virgin Mary, the left chapel to Saint Joseph, and the right chapel to Saint Livier.

The following picture presents the ground plan of Saint-Stephen of Metz and the position of the architectural elements:

Number	Architectural element	Plan of Metz Cathedral
1	Westwork	
2	Porch	
3	Portal Portal of the Virgin	
4	Narthex	
5	Side chapel Blessed Sacrament chapel	
6	Spire Mutte tower	
7	Lady Chapel	
8	Aisle	
9	Organ	
10	Southern transept	
11	Entrance of the crypt	
12	Apse chapel	
13	Ambulatory	
14	Apse (Chevet)	
15	East end	
16	Apse chapel	
17	Northern transept	
18	Aisle	
19	Bell tower Capitulum tower	
20	Altar candle	
21	Nave	
22	Crossing of the transept	
23	Altar	
24	Lectern	
25	Choir (choirstalls)	
26	Axis	The elements 1, 2, 4, 13, 14, 15, 19, 21, 22, 23, and 25 constitute the axis (south-southwest/north-northeast, respectively). On its exterior, the cathedral is 136 metres (446 ft) long.

== Painting and sculpture ==
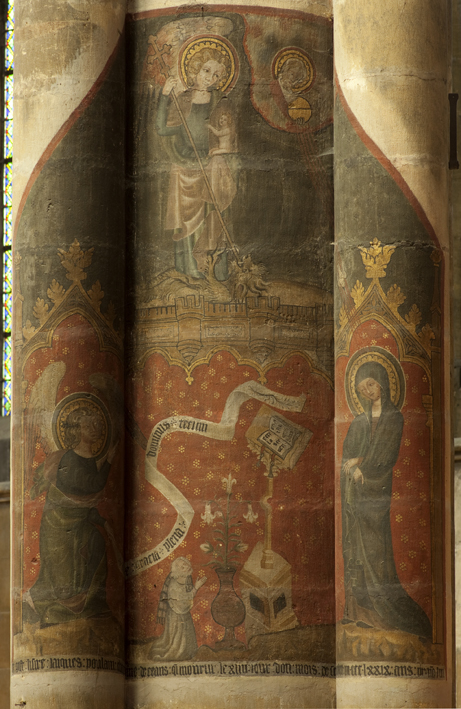
Epitaph of Jacques Poulain, with Fresco of the Virgin (14th c.)

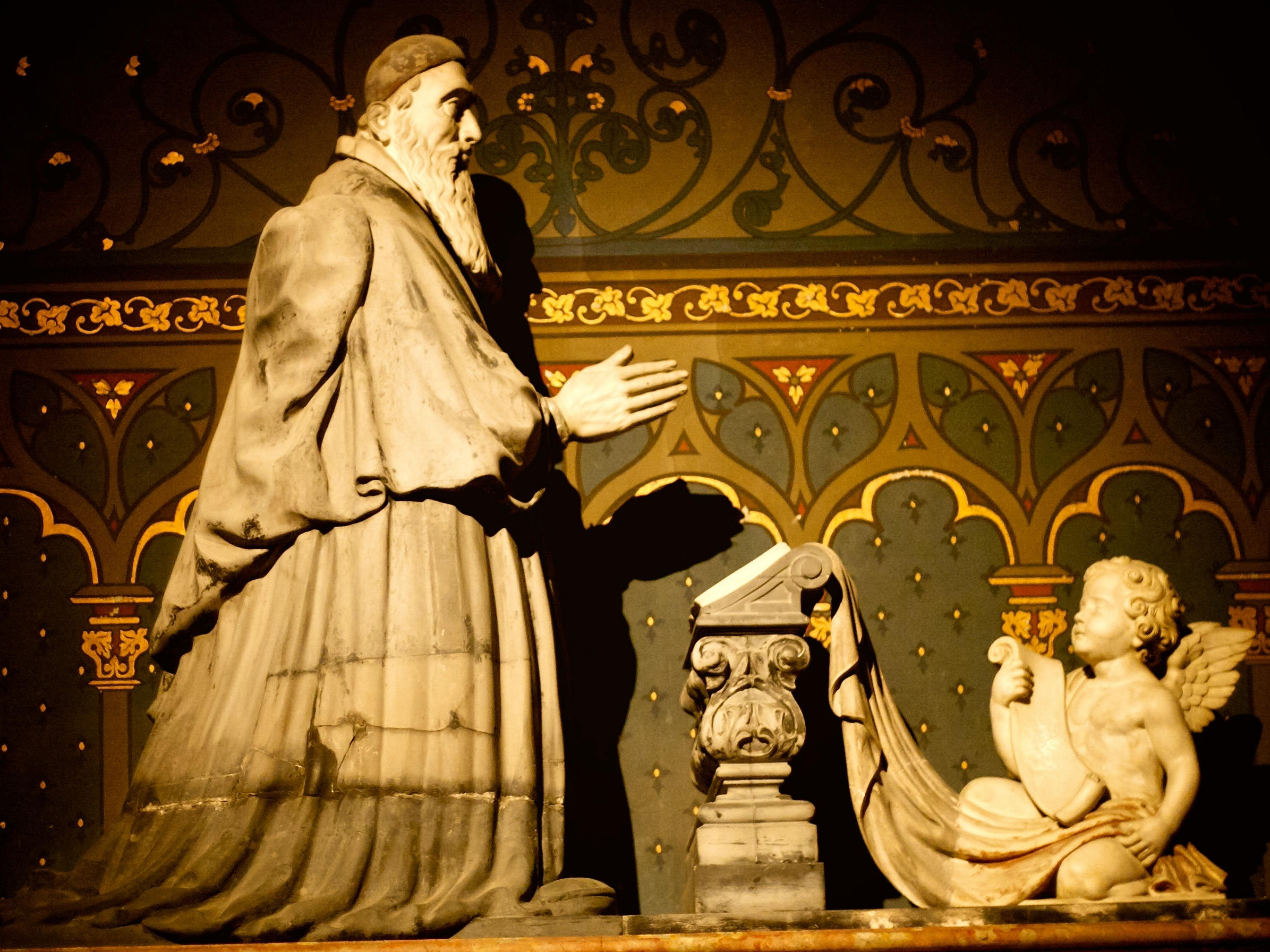
Tomb of a bishop

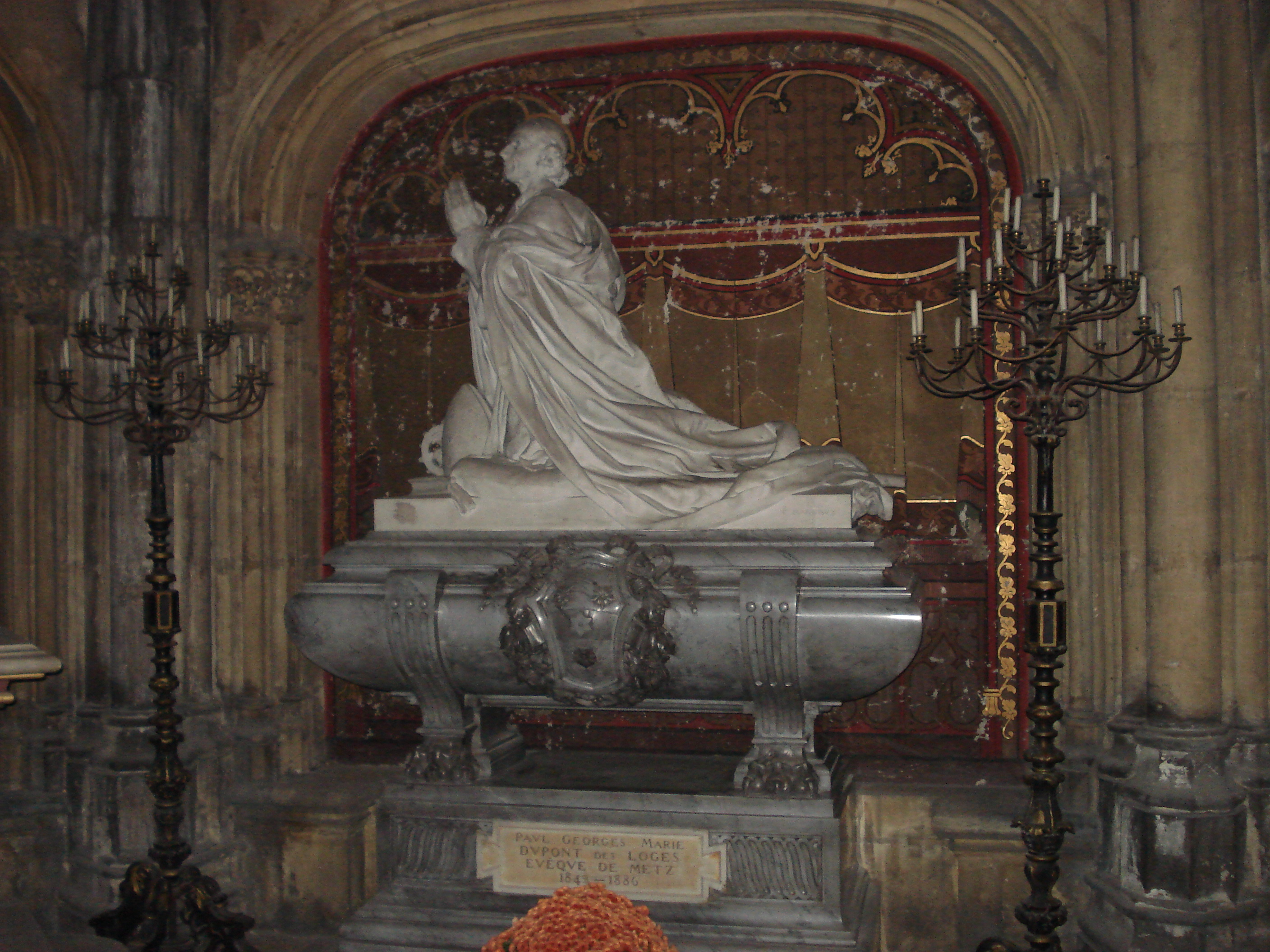
Tomb of Bishop Dupont des Loges (died 1896) by Emmanuel Hannaux (1923)

The chapels of the transept were decorated in the 14th century with murals on the columns, which served as epitaphs for prominent church figures. These were covered over with plaster in the remodelling of the 17th century and rediscovered and restored between 1840 and 1909. One good example is the painted epitaph of Jacques Poulain, from 1379, located on the north side at the sixth pillar.

== Stained glass ==
The stained glass windows of the cathedral range in date from the 13th century to the 20th century, and cover an area of 6500 square meters; the cathedral has the most stained glass of any medieval religious monument.

The early windows resemble mosaics, made of very small pieces of thick, deeply-colored glass bound together by thin strips of lead. The later windows became much larger and thinner, as glassmaking technology improved, with support of iron bars and stone tracery. They were often colored with silver stain, and enamel paints which could be etched to give different shades and three dimensions, more closely resembling Renaissance paintings. The later Gothic periods also made greater use of grisaille, glass colored white, grey or other pale colors, to bring more light into the interior, and to highlight the colored glass. Most of the original glass was removed in the centuries after the Middle Ages. Most of the glass today is restored or a more modern replacement.

The windows of Metz were made by the master craftsmen including Hermann von Münster in the fourteenth century, and Valentin Bousch in the sixteenth. In the twentieth century, the artist Marc Chagall created three stained glass windows for the cathedral between 1958 and 1968. Roger Bissière and Jacques Villon provided designs for further windows, including the complete chapel of the Holy Sacrament.

=== Early glass (13th century) ===
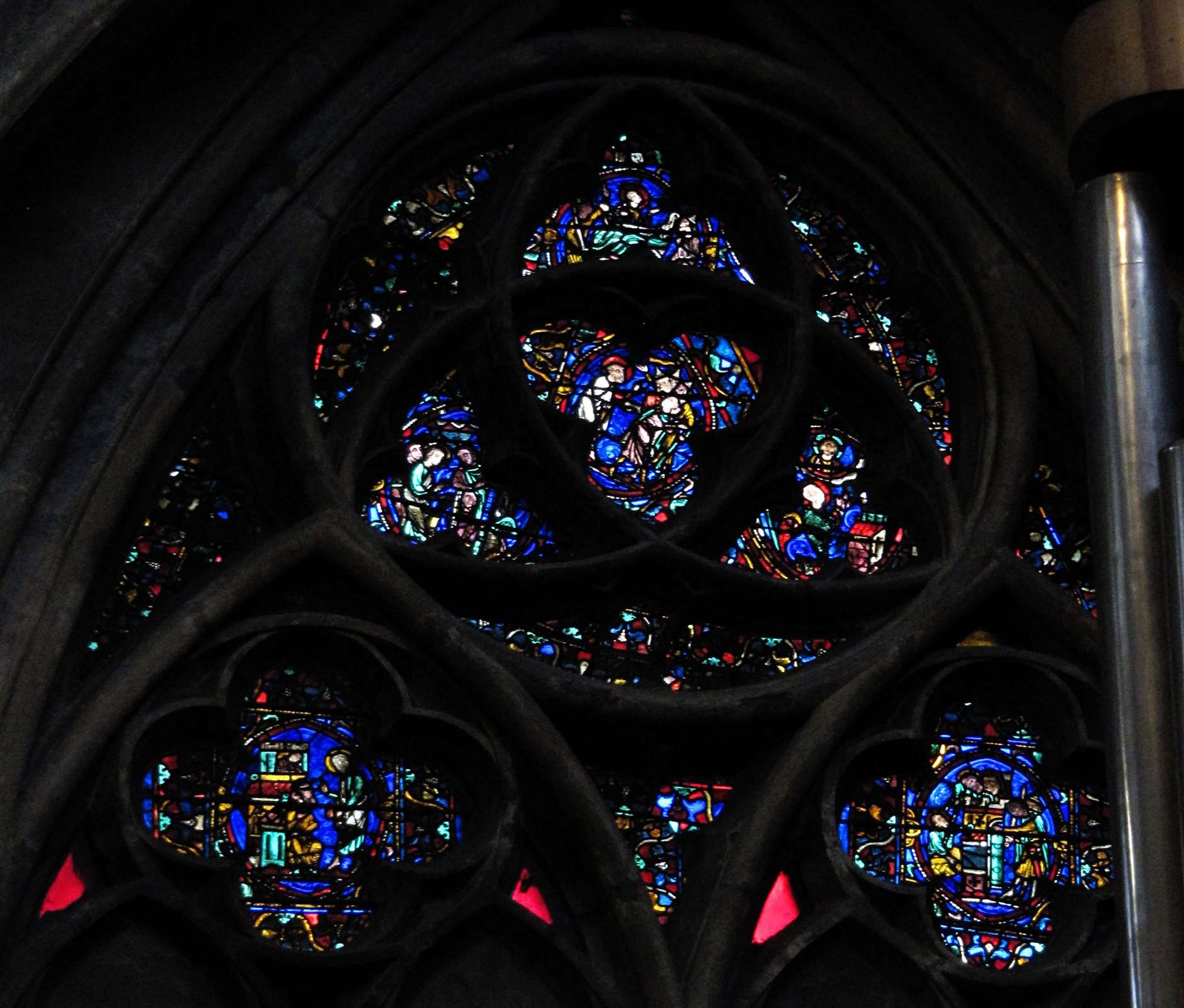
The oldest glass of the cathedral. Located on one side of the southern transept, Scenes from Life of Saint Paul (13th century)

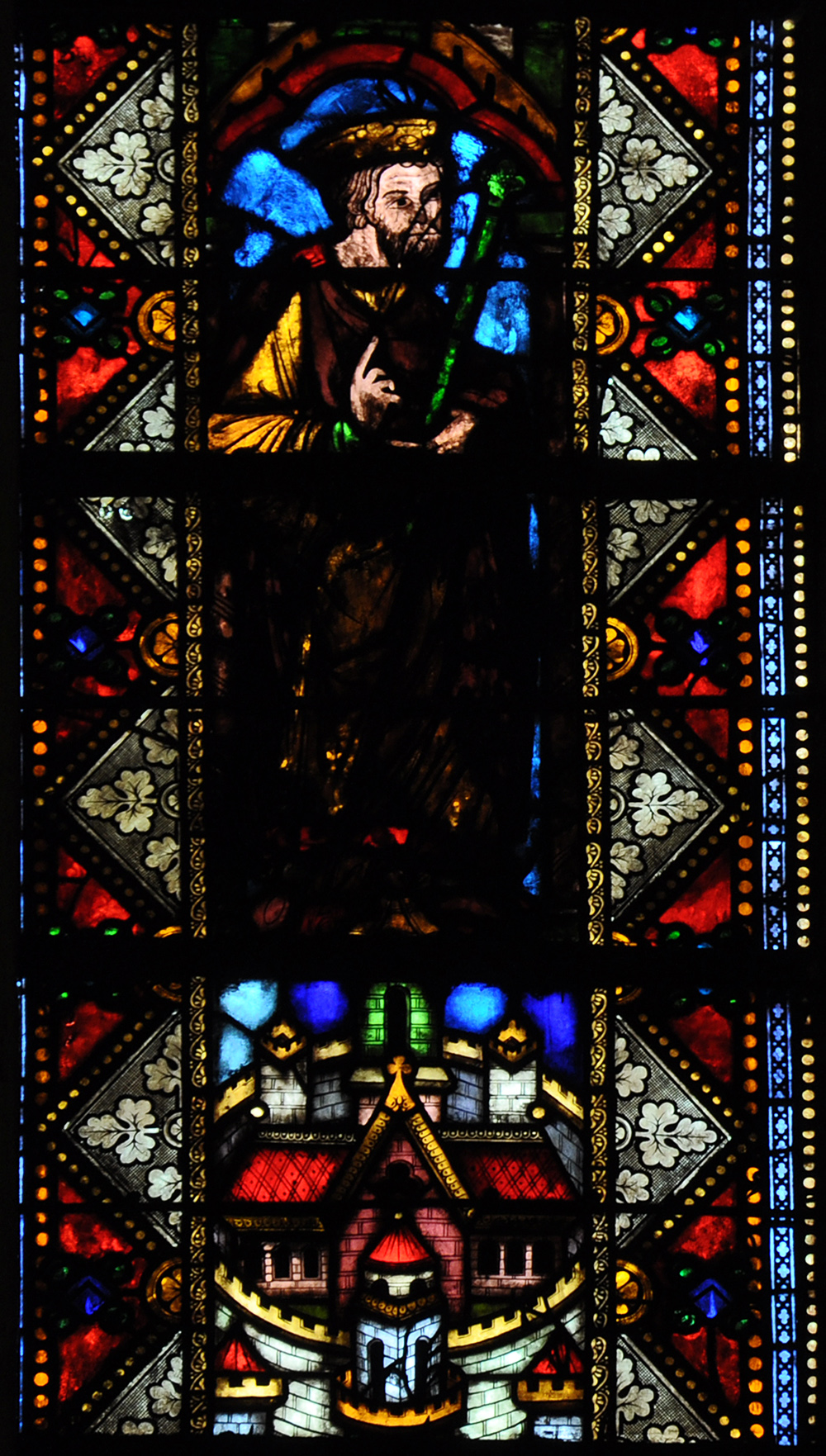
Detail of early glass

The earliest glass in the cathedral, from the third quarter of the 13th century, is found in the central bay of the Chapel of Notre-Dame-La-Rond, on the north side of the cathedral near the portal of that name. The glass was originally all in one window, but was separated and now is displayed in two parts in the lower portions of the bays. In the north (Bay 33) are the lancet windows which illustrate the genealogy of Christ and the Virgin Mary, as well as the prophets and apostles. In the South (Bay 28) is the oculus of the original window, with the crowning of the Virgin. This window very unusually depicts the Virgin to the left of Christ, who is presenting the crown to her with his left hand. A similar arrangement from the same period is found in Strasbourg Cathedral.

=== 14th–15th century glass ===
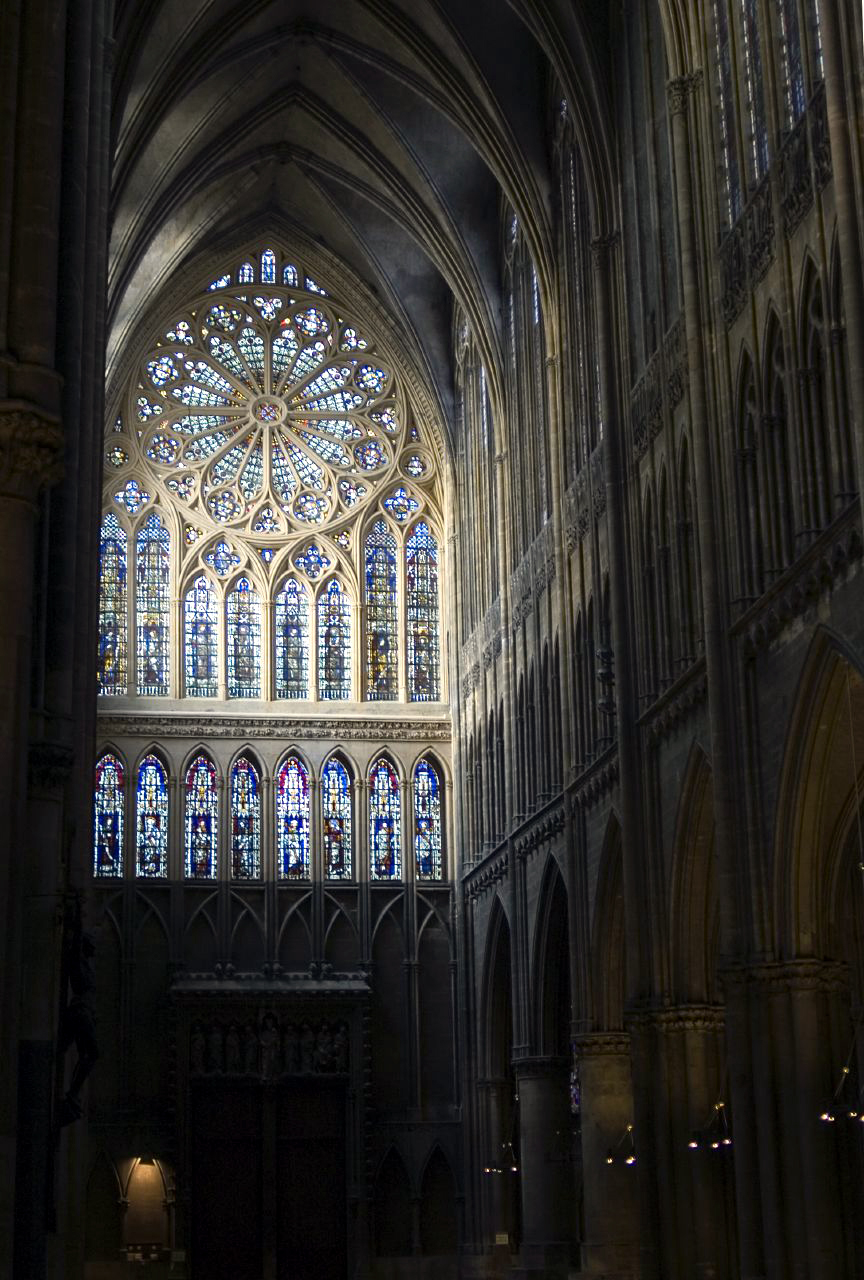
Western rose window at Metz by Hermann von Munster

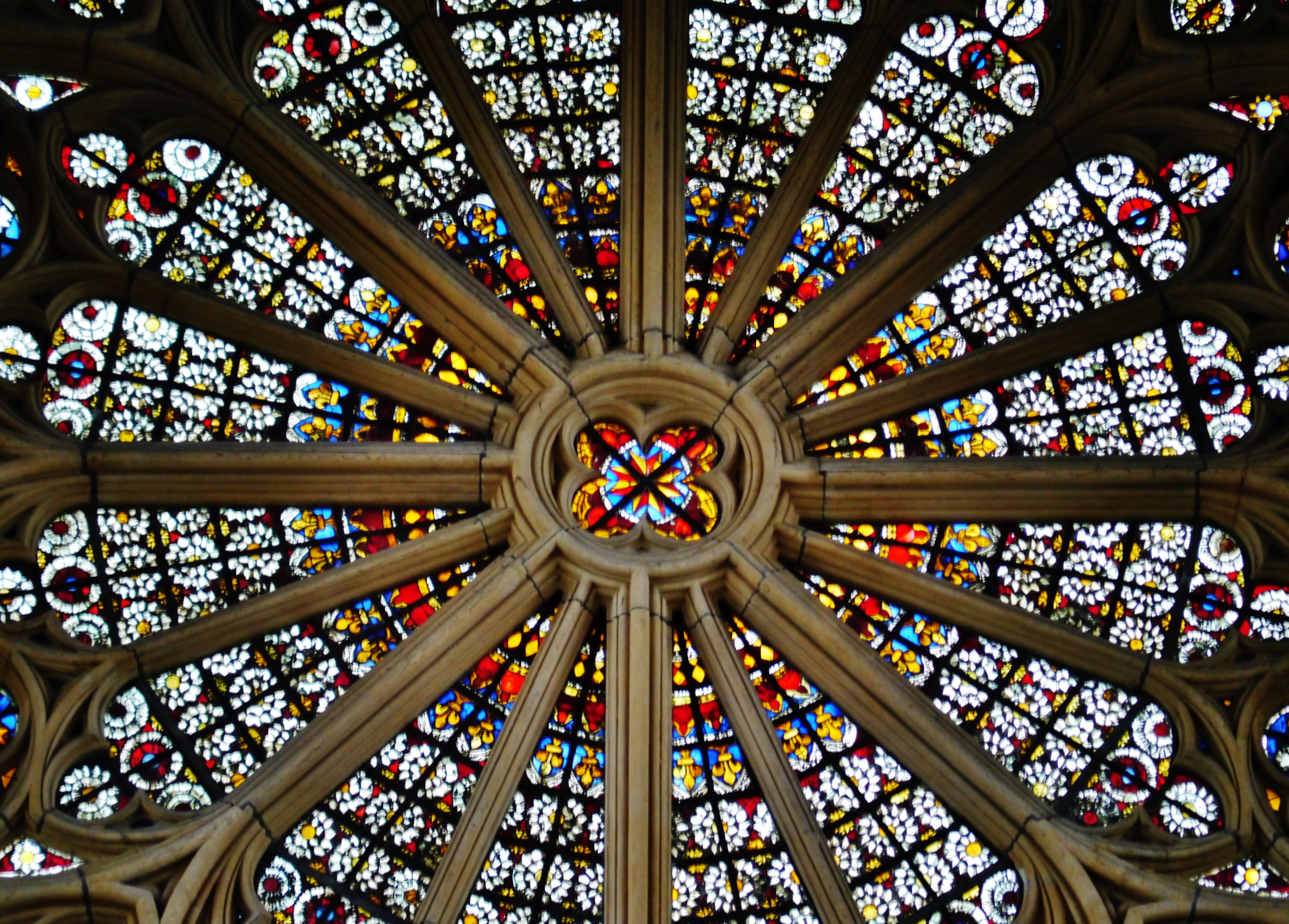
Inner rose window by Hermann von Munster

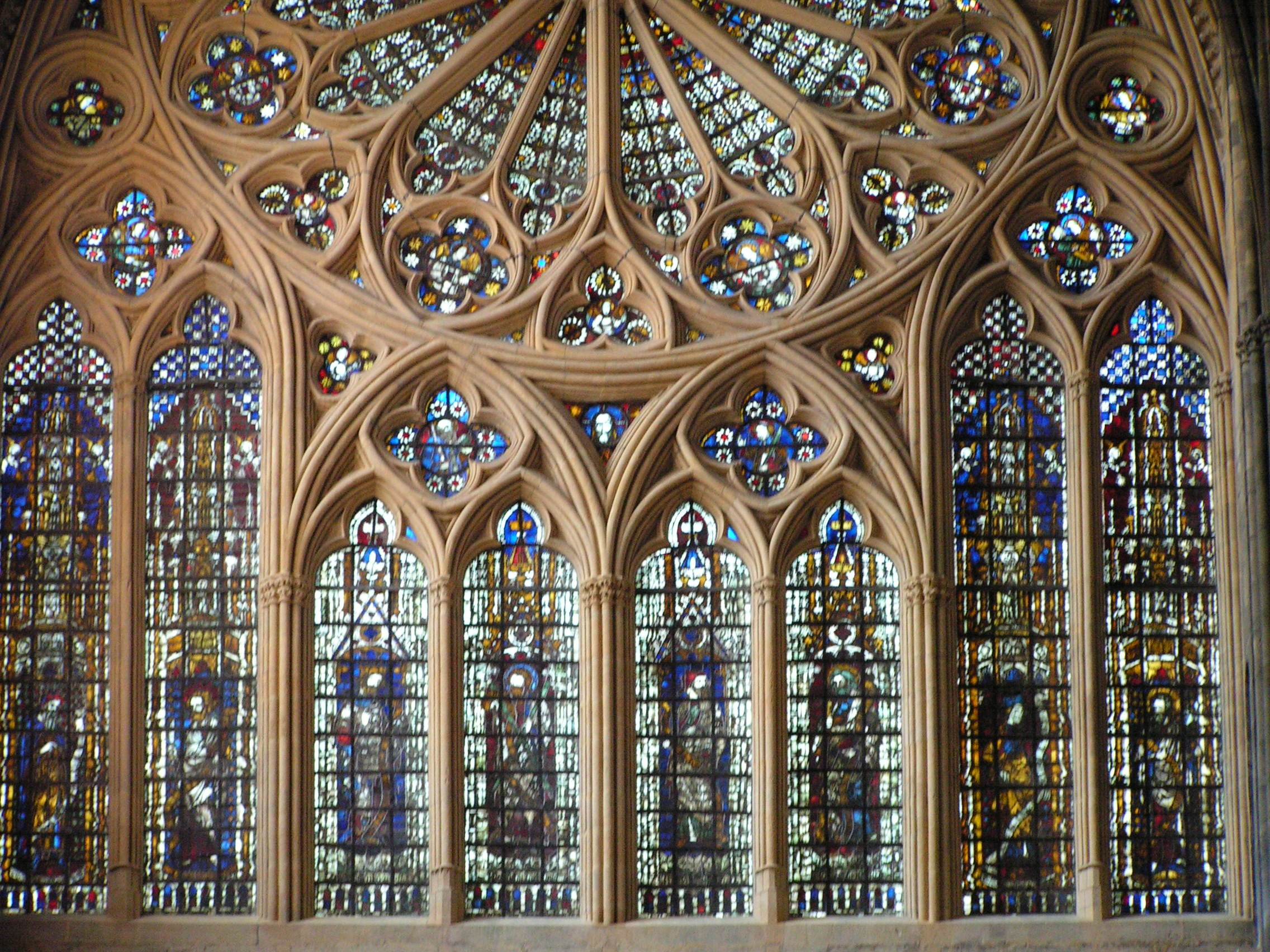
Detail of the West Rose Window

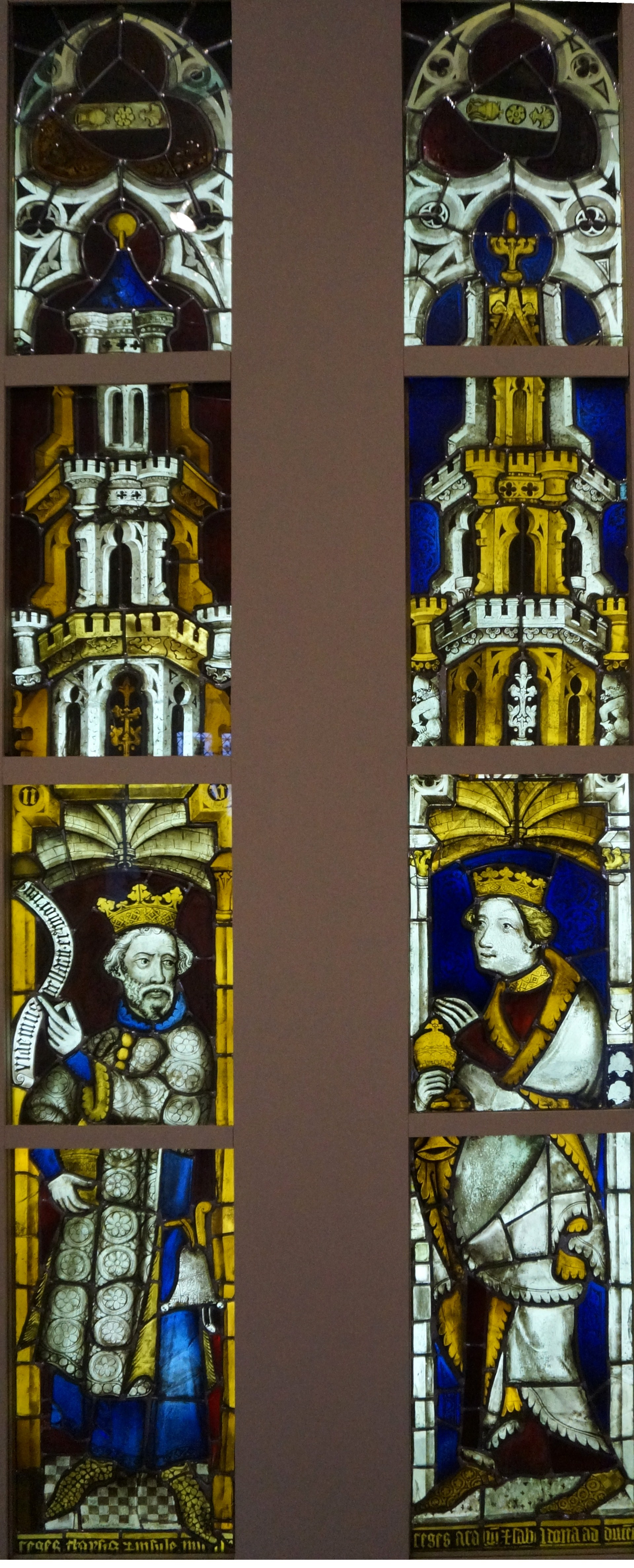
Adoration of the Magi by Hermann von Munster (1390)

A number of important windows were installed in the 14th century, including the great rose window of the western facade. This window was the work of Hermann von Munster, who created an ambitious program of windows. Other windows he designed were placed in the north and south arms of the transept, the west bay and the north and south arms of the transept.

=== 16th century glass ===
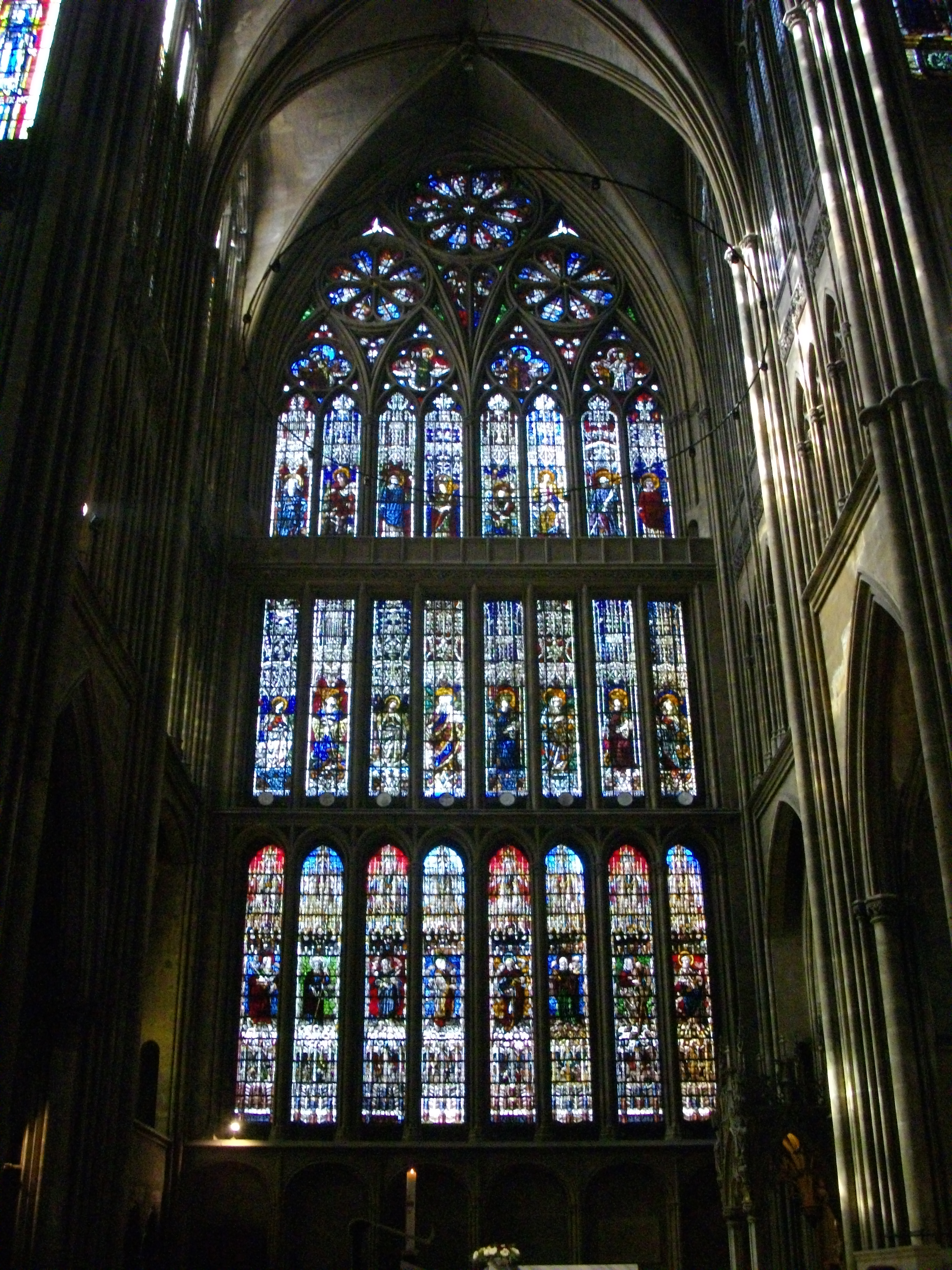
The north transept windows by Theobald of Lixheim

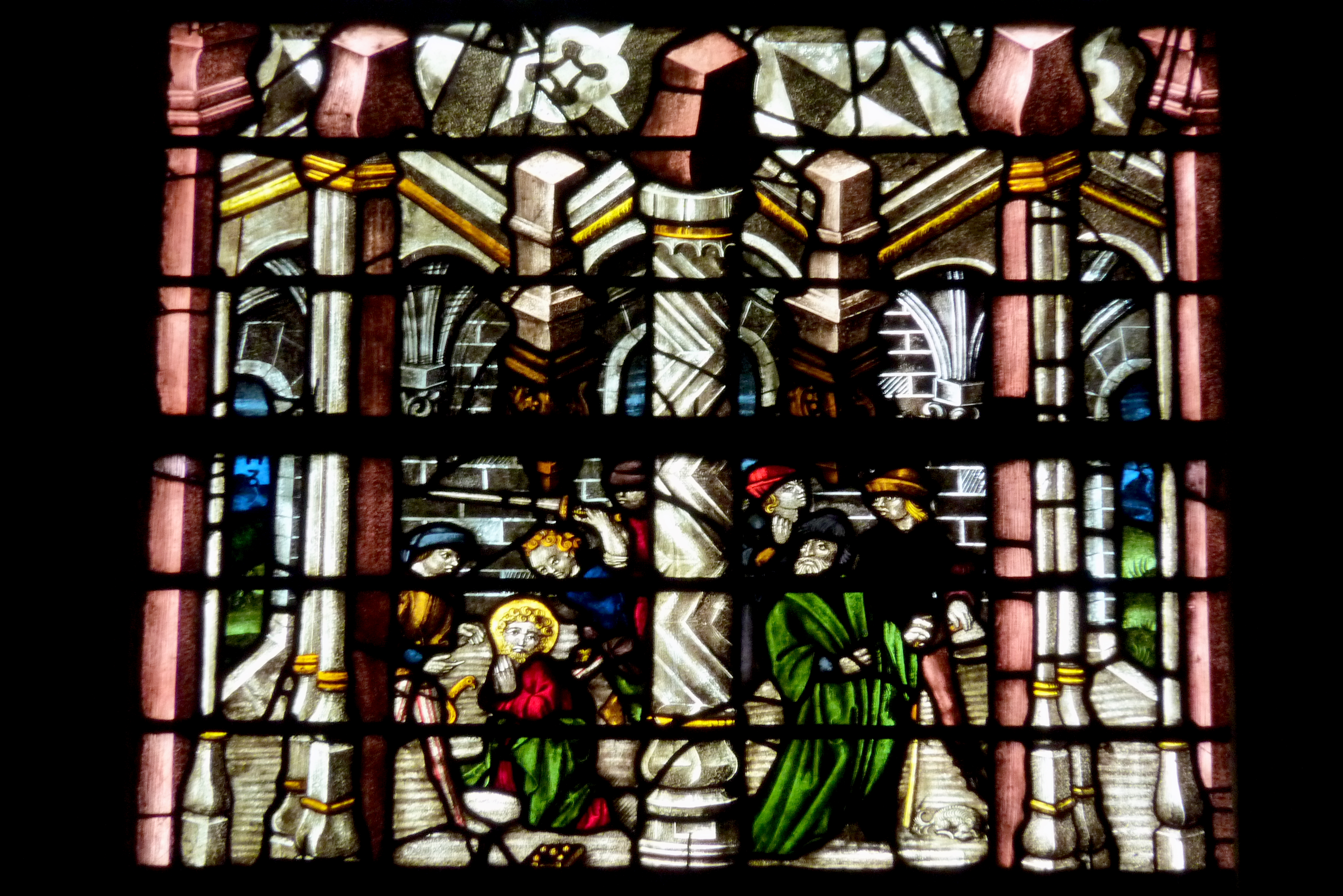
Detail of north transept windows

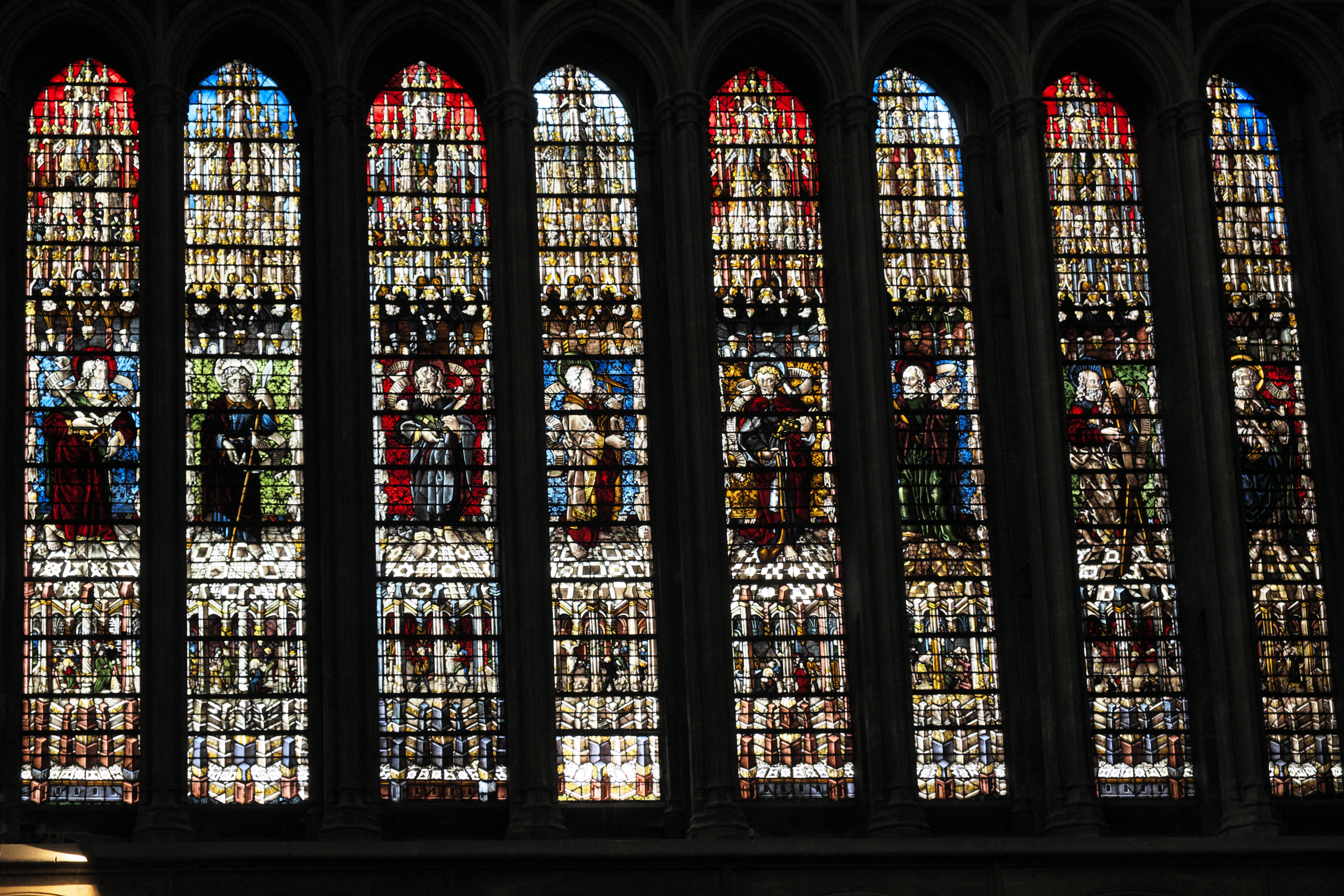
Detail of north transept windows – apostles

The most prominent examples of 16th-century glass are the windows of the north face of the transept, made by Theobald of Lixheim in 1504, and the windows of the south face of the transept, made by Valentin Bousch between 1521 and 1536. The figures of the last clearly show the influence of the Renaissance, with a full use of perspective, shading, giving the windows a close resemblance to Renaissance paintings.

=== 20th century – modern windows ===
Windows by Jacques Villon

Between 1954 and 1958 most of the upper windows of the nave were replaced with windows designed to harmonize with the early Gothic windows by Jean Gaudin, who had restored the windows of Amiens Cathedral. Then, in 1956, Robert Renaud, chief architect of the Center of National Monuments, commissioned a group of windows for the Chapel of the Holy Sacrament designed by the cubist-impressionist Jacques Villon, the brother of pioneer modernist Marcel Duchamp, then eighty years old. The windows are composed of intersecting lines and planes of different colors, represents the Last Supper and Crucifixion, surrounded by abstract images of earlier Biblical symbols; the rock of Mount Horeb, the Marriage at Cana, the Book of Exodus and a lamb representing Easter. They were installed in 1957.

Two other abstract windows were made by Roger Bissière for the portal of La Mutte and the portal of the Tower of the Chapter. The former, facing the rising sun, has warm abstract colors, while the latter window, facing the sunset, has cool colors.

The best-known windows are those designed by Marc Chagall. They were commissioned at the same time that he was chosen by André Malraux, French Minister of Culture, to decorate the central dome of the Paris Opera. The first, in Bay 17 of the west of the north transept, made between 1958 and 1961, depicts Genesis and the creation, the original sin, and the expulsion from Eden. Two additional groups were made for two bays in the north disambulatory (bays 11 and 9). They were made between 1961 and 1967, and depict Old Testament scenes, including Moses receiving the Ten Commandments, the Sacrifice of Abraham, the Burning Bush, and other events. The final series done by Chagall was created between 1968 and 1970 in the west triforium. These windows are "Grand Bouquet", a composition of birds and flowers and a rainbow on a background of nacre (Bays 111 and 113) and "Petit Bouquet" (Bays 107–109).

In 2022, abstract stained-glass windows designed by the South Korean artist Kimsooja were installed in the triforium bays of the south transept, replacing recent colourless lozenge glazing. Commissioned by the French state as a public artwork for the 800th anniversary of the Gothic cathedral, they were made with the master glassmaker Pierre-Alain Parot, combining mouth-blown and dichroic glass, and their colours draw on the traditional Korean obangsaek palette. They were inaugurated on 15 September 2022 in the presence of the artist.

Number	Master glass maker	Plan of Saint-Stephen of Metz
1	Hermann von Münster's windows	
2	Jacques Villon's windows	
3	Valentin Bousch's windows	
4	Valentin Bousch's windows	
5	Marc Chagall's windows	
6	Theobald of Lixheim's windows	
7	Marc Chagall's windows	
8	Roger Bissière's windows	

== Organs ==
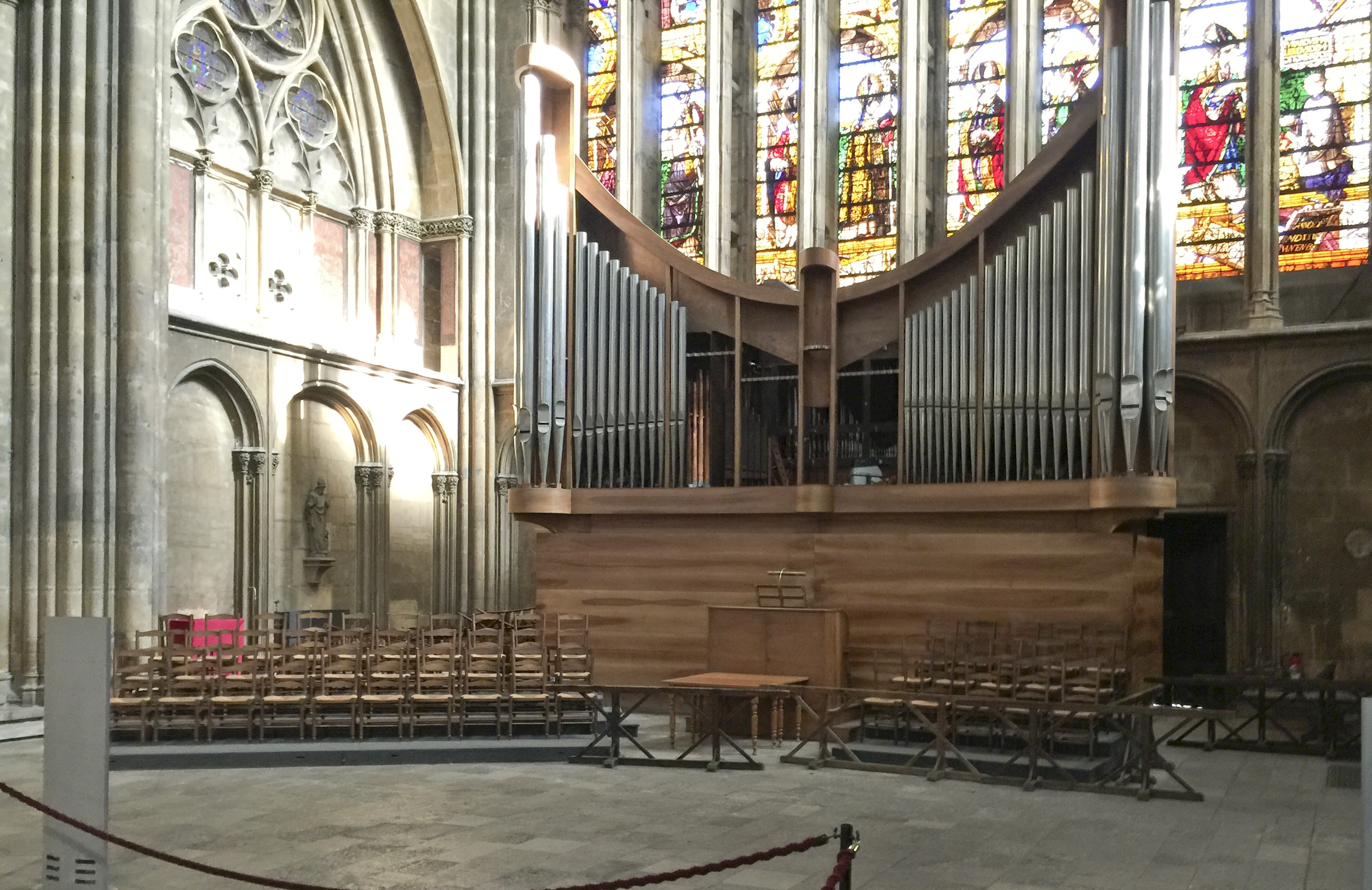
The modern organ, placed in the south transept

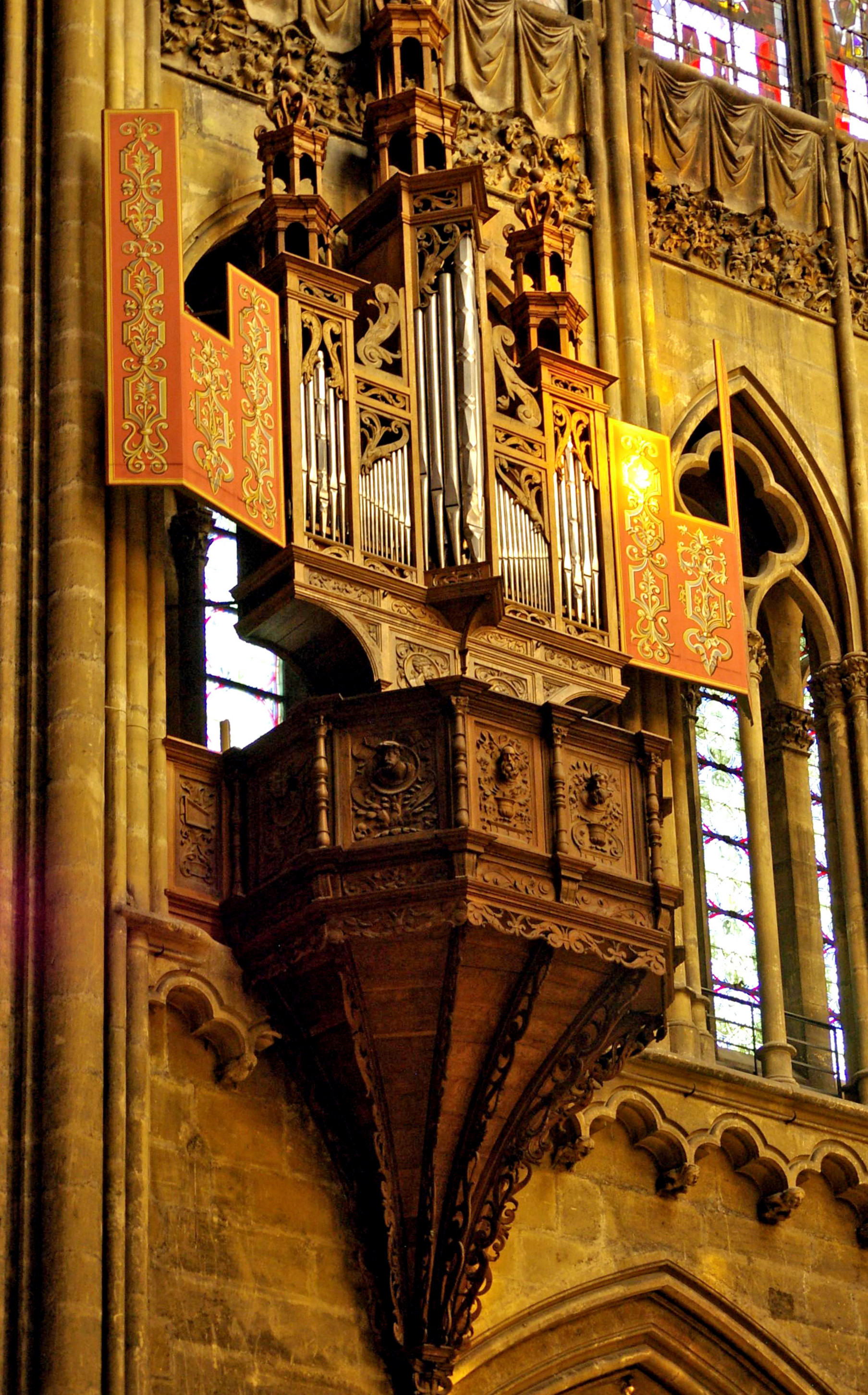
The Renaissance organ, now on the triforium of the nave (1537)

Metz Cathedral has four organs. The oldest, called the "Renaissance" organ, is a swallow's nest organ perched on the triforium of the last traverse of the nave, closest to the choir. It was placed there above the former rood screen to accompany ceremonies of the clergy taking place within the choir. It was made in 1537, and while the instrument has been regularly modified and updated, the wooden buffet or cabinet is original. Its instrumental part was entirely rebuilt by Marc Garnier in 1981, and the organ is listed as a monument historique. · Dismantled in November 2021 and restored in Switzerland by the organ builder Peter Meier, it was inaugurated again on 10 July 2022.

An organ built by Aristide Cavaillé-Coll in 1862 stands behind the high altar; it has since been altered and moved, and now has thirty stops, ten of which are wholly or partly original. The larger organ in the south transept was built in 1970 by Haerpfer-Erman of Boulay and is used to accompany services; it is electrically linked to the organ behind the high altar, so that both can be played together. A small four-stop organ was installed in the crypt by Charles Mutin in 1905. Thierry Ferré has been the cathedral's titular organist since 2020.

== Crypt ==
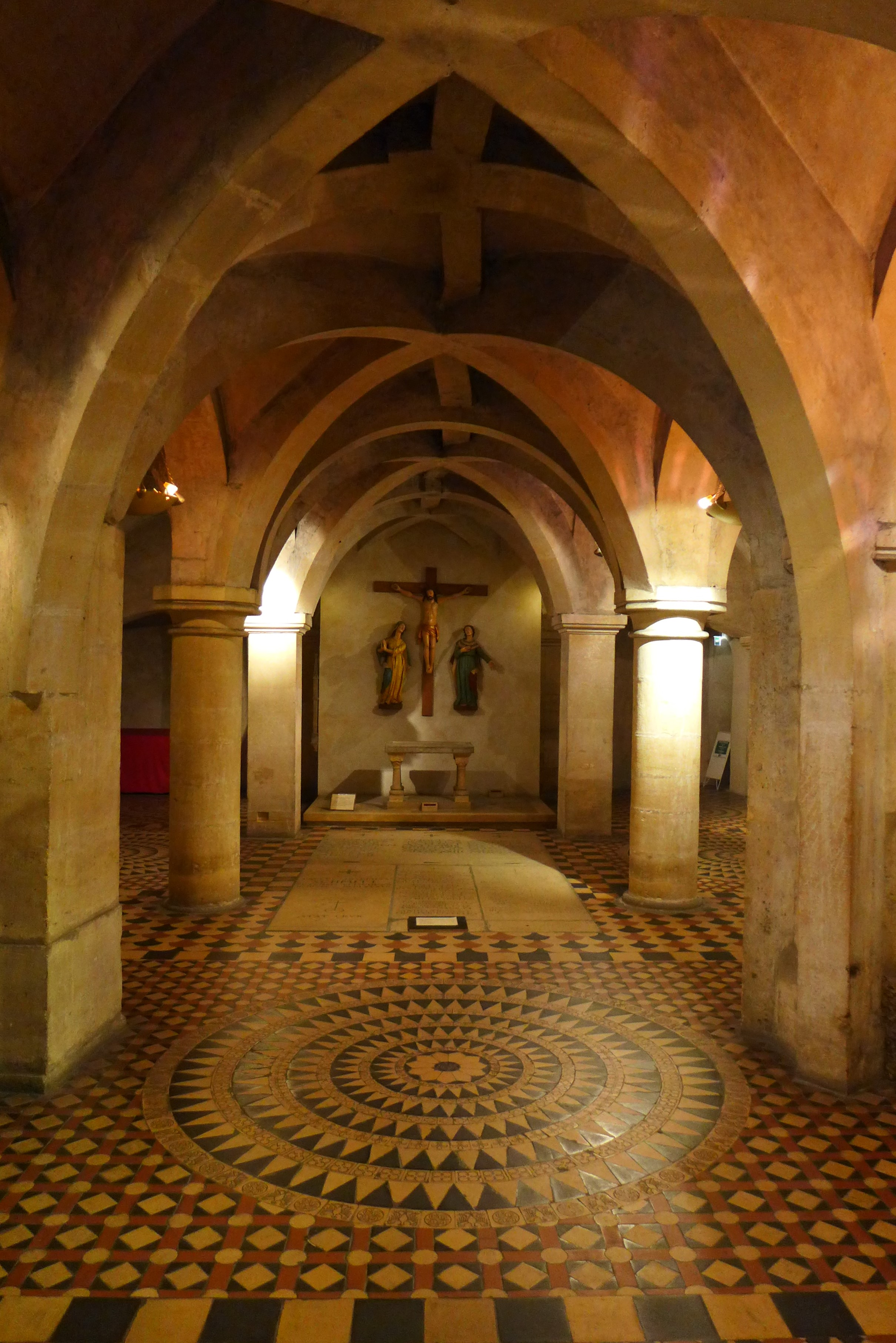
The crypt beneath the transept and apse

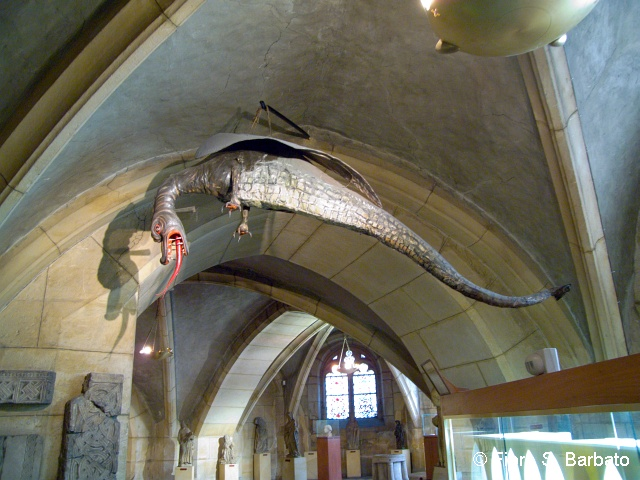
The Graouilly, a dragon figure carried in processions, now in the cathedral crypt

The original romanesque crypt beneath the choir was enlarged at the beginning of the 16th century to serve as a foundation for the new chevet. and contains ambulatory leading to three chapels. It was originally largely filled with tombs, It now serves as a museum of cathedral history.The south crypt was restored and given a new display by the Œuvre de la Cathédrale over two years, at a cost of €500,000; it was officially inaugurated on 15 September 2026 and reopened to the public on 19 September. The Cape of Charlemagne, until then kept in the treasury and shown only once a year, was moved into a purpose-built glass case in the crypt. ·

The crypt displays the Graouilly, a large figure of the mythical dragon which was said in legend to have been slain by Saint Clement in about 1000 AD. It was carried in religious processions in Metz beginning the 13th century and was described by Rabelais after his stay in Metz in 1546–47. The body of the current Graouilly is made of canvas covering a metal frame is from the 19th century, while the head is wood from an 18th-century effigy of the creature.

== Treasury ==
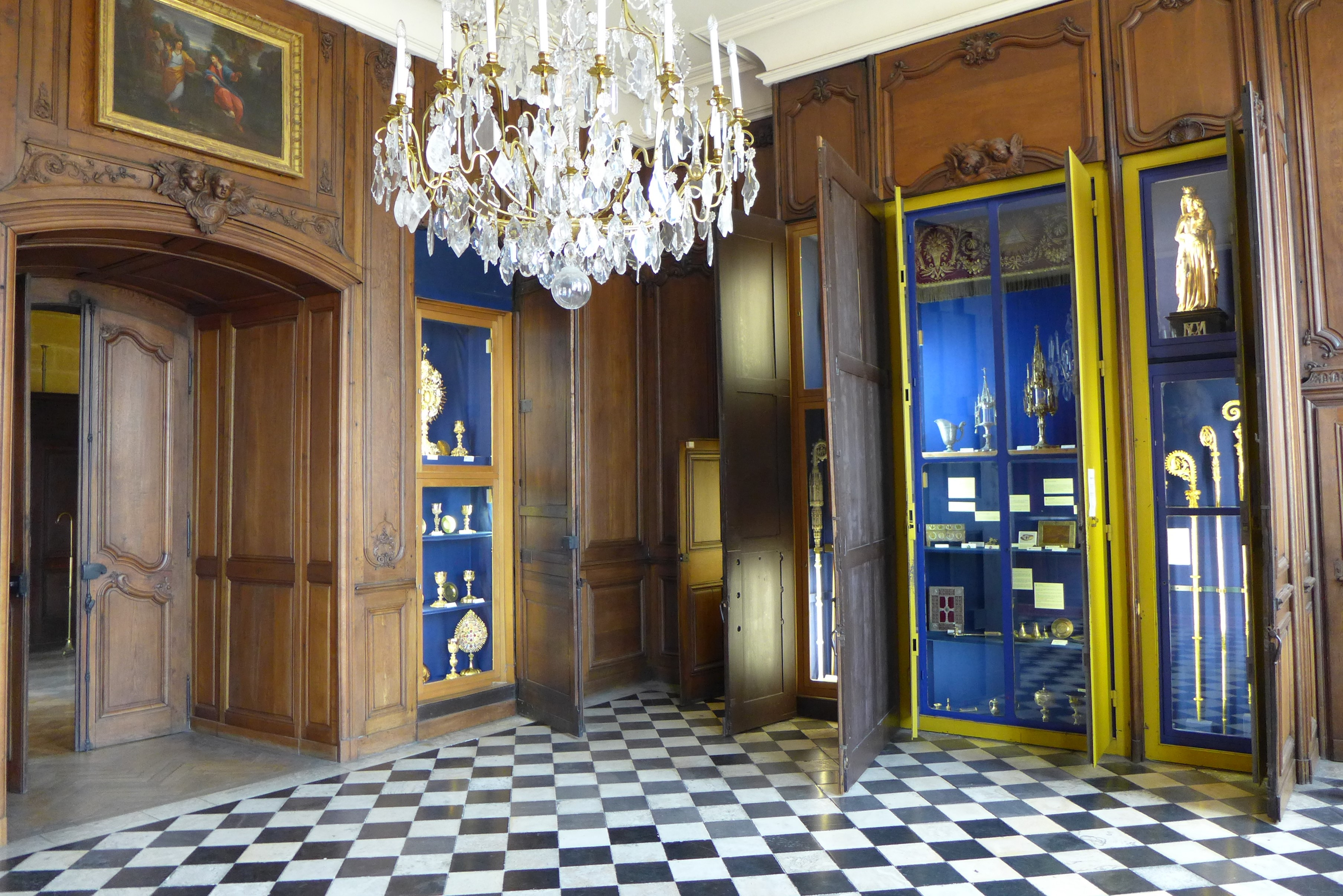
The Treasury, located in the Sacristy

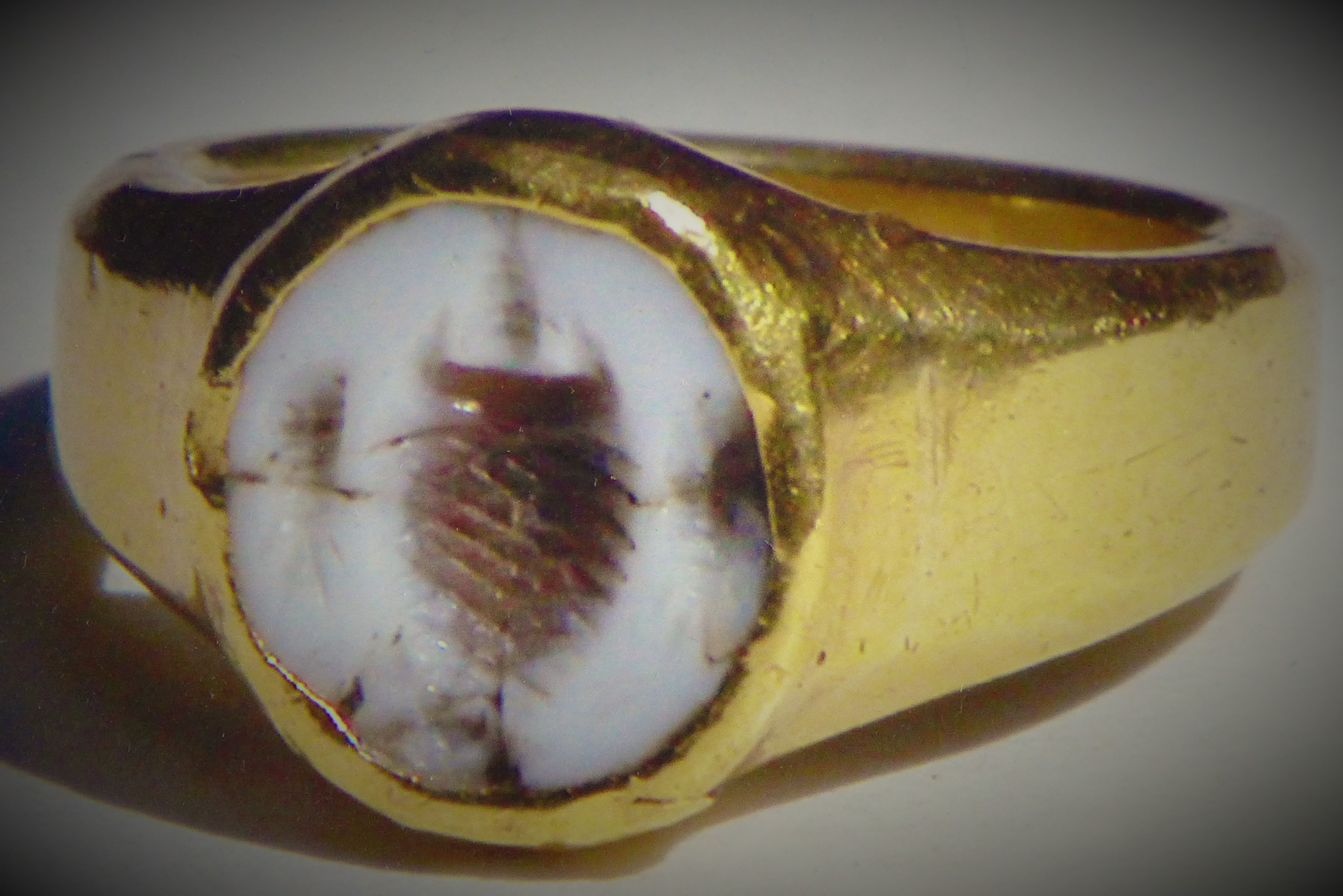
The Ring of saint Arnoul (7th century)

The treasury of the cathedral, located in the old sacristy next to the south transept, lost most of its precious objects during the French Revolution, when they were taken away to be melted down for their gold or stripped of their jewels. The most famous item of the treasury is the reputed "Cape of Charlemagne", a garment probably made in the 12th century, which has been displayed in the south crypt since 2026. It is made of purple silk with three large eagles embroidered with gold, whose wings are decorated with roses and griffons. It was further adorned during the Renaissance with a hood embroidered with silver. The treasury also displays a large Bishop's ring made of stone and gold, called the Ring of Saint Arnoul, made in the 7th century. It is one of the oldest Bishop's rings still existing. The Carolingian bronze equestrian statuette of Charlemagne or Charles the Bald, now in the Louvre, also belonged to the cathedral treasury; it was rediscovered in Metz by Alexandre Lenoir in 1807. A cast of the statuette is displayed in the treasury. The treasury also held the Drogo Sacramentary, an illuminated manuscript commissioned in the mid-9th century by Bishop Drogo of Metz, which remained there until the French Revolution and is now in the Bibliothèque nationale de France (MS Latin 9428). ·. The Psalter of Charles the Bald (BnF, MS Latin 1152), copied before 869 by the scribe Liuthard at the palace school of Charles the Bald, also belonged to the cathedral before entering the collection of Jean-Baptiste Colbert. ·

== See also ==
- Gothic cathedrals and churches
- French Gothic architecture
- List of highest church naves
- List of tallest churches
- List of Gothic Cathedrals in Europe
- Mont Saint-Quentin in Moselle Valley

== Bibliography ==
- Brisac, Catherine (1994). Le Vitrail (in French). Paris: La Martinière. ISBN 2-73-242117-0.
- Wagner, Pierre Édouard (2013). Cathédrale Saint-Étienne de Metz (in French). Centre des monuments nationaux, Éditions du patrimoine. ISBN 978-2-7577-0262-8.
