= Wuxi Institute of Technology =

Educational institution in Wuxi, China

The Wuxi University of Technology (无锡职业技术大学), previously known as Wuxi Institute of Technology (无锡职业技术学院), is a technological and vocational university in the city of Wuxi, Jiangsu, China. It was originally founded in 1959 as the Wuxi Agricultural Mechanics Manufacturing School (无锡农业机械制造学校), and adopted its current name in 1999.

It was upgraded to Wuxi University of Technology in 2025.
