= Wuxi =

Wuxi 無錫市 / 无锡市 Wusih, Wuhsi
- Prefecture-level city
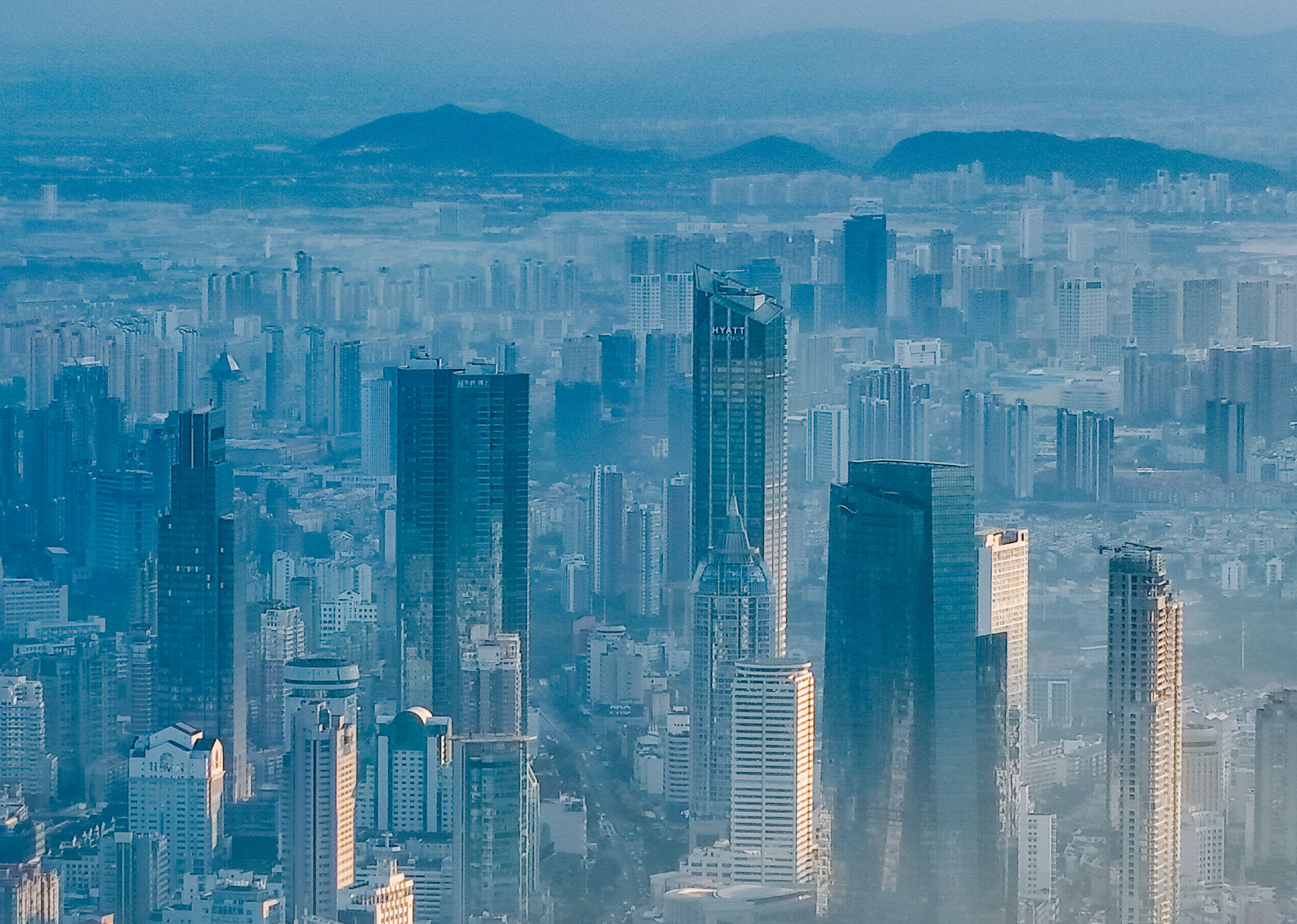
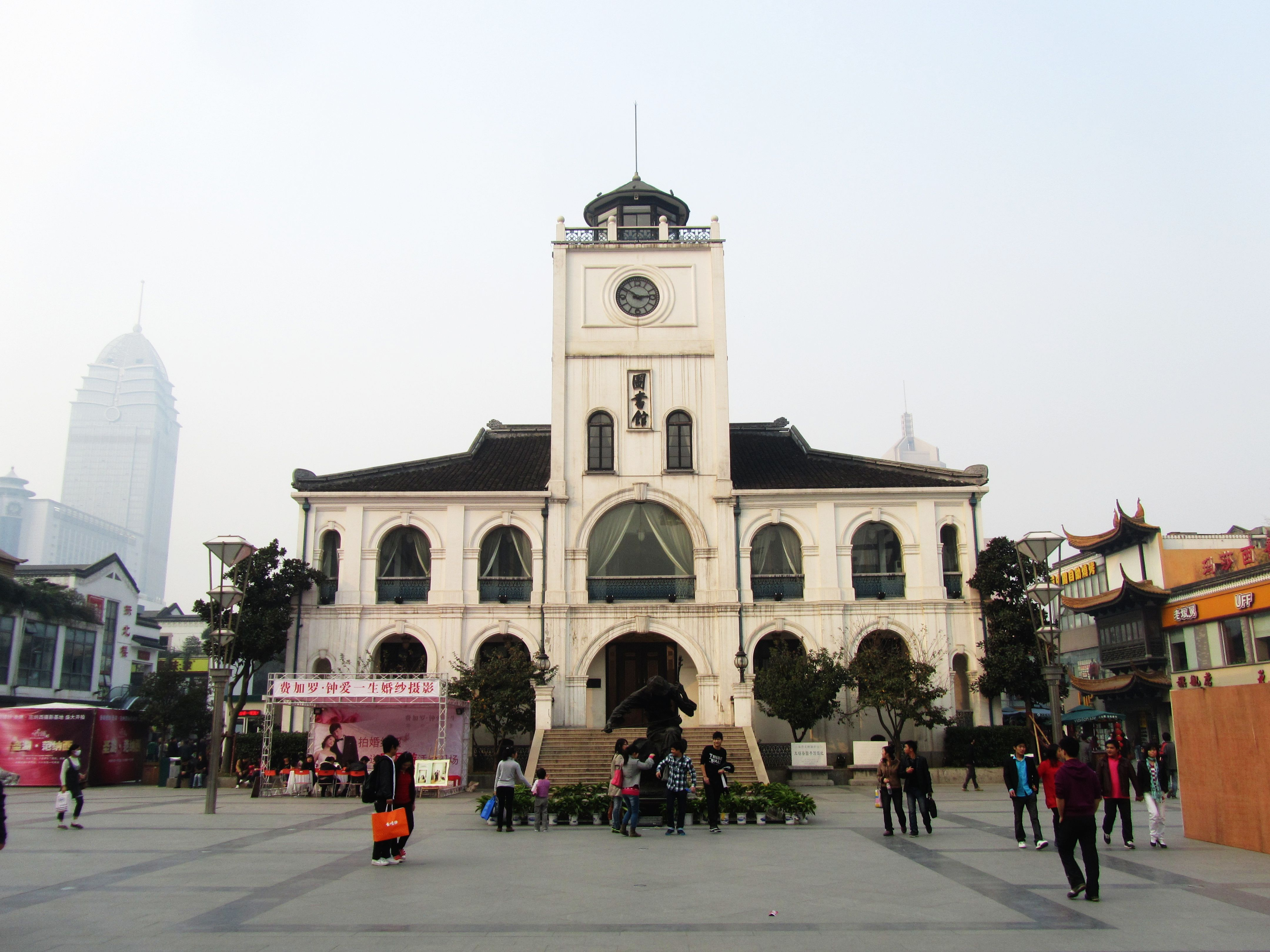
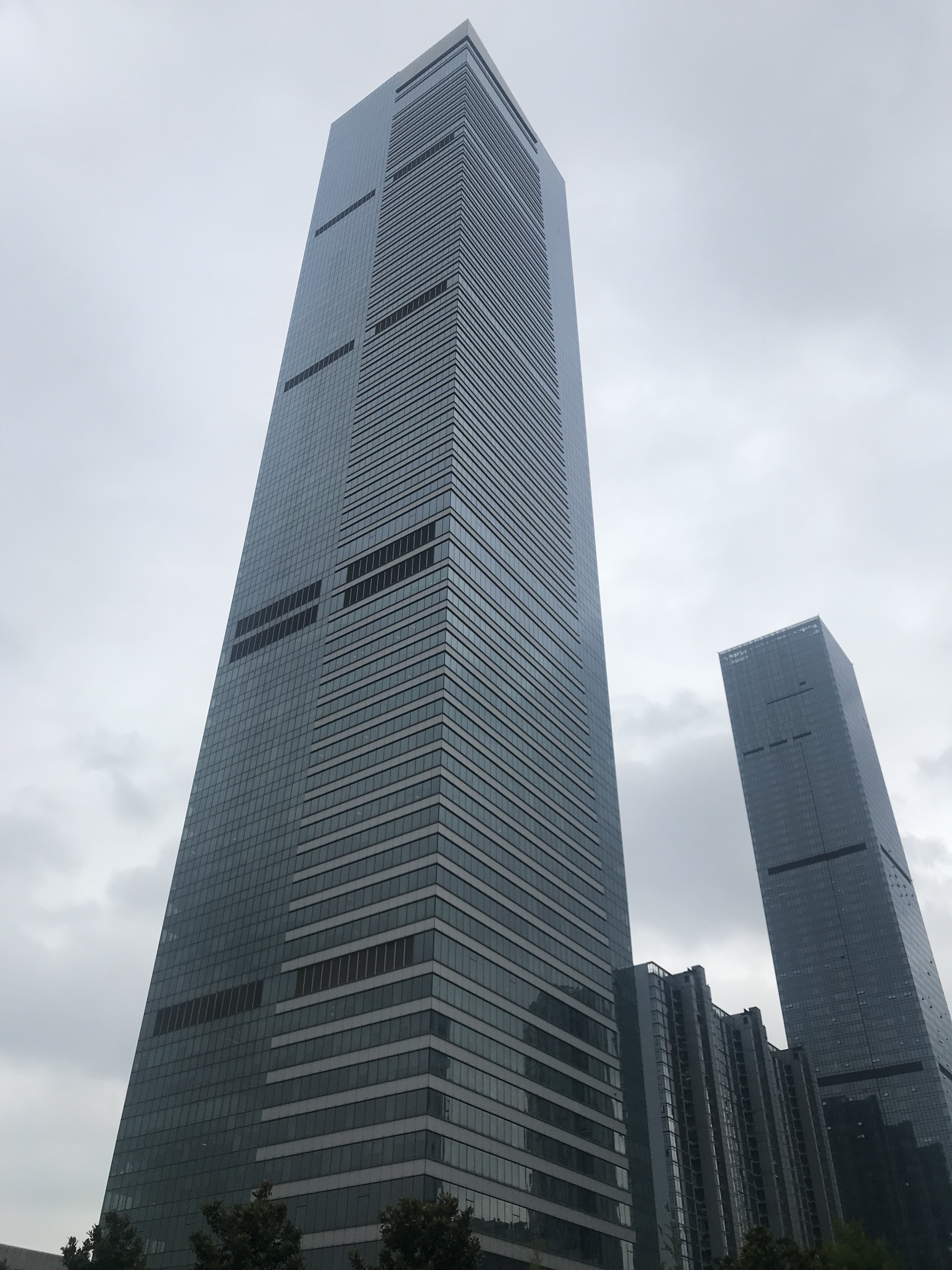
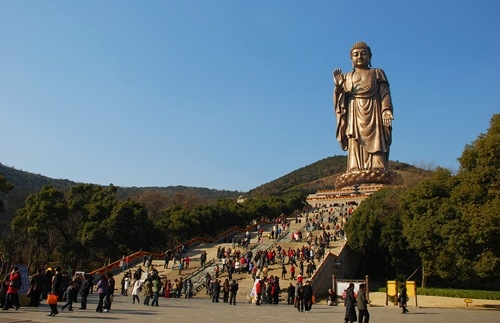
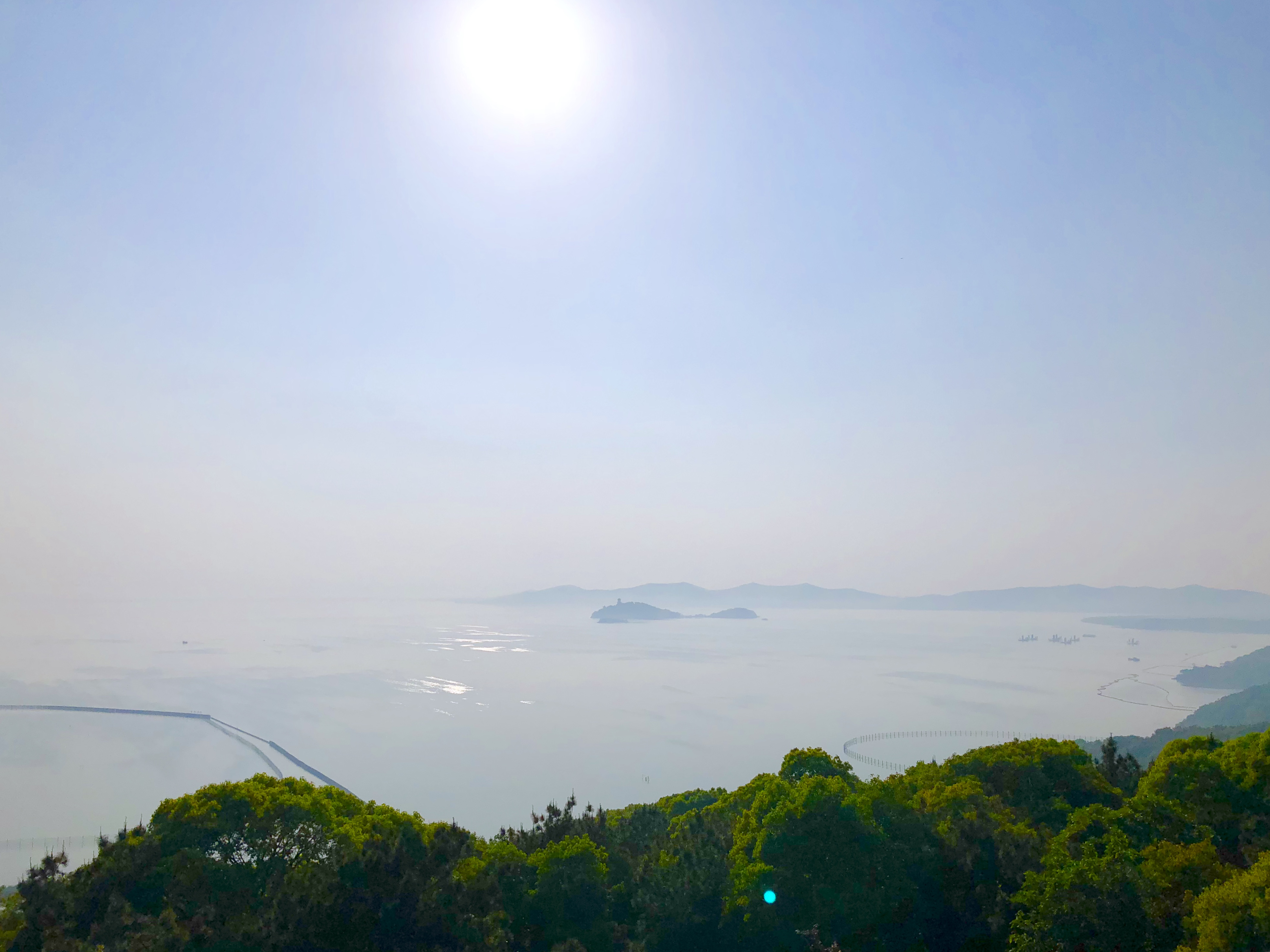
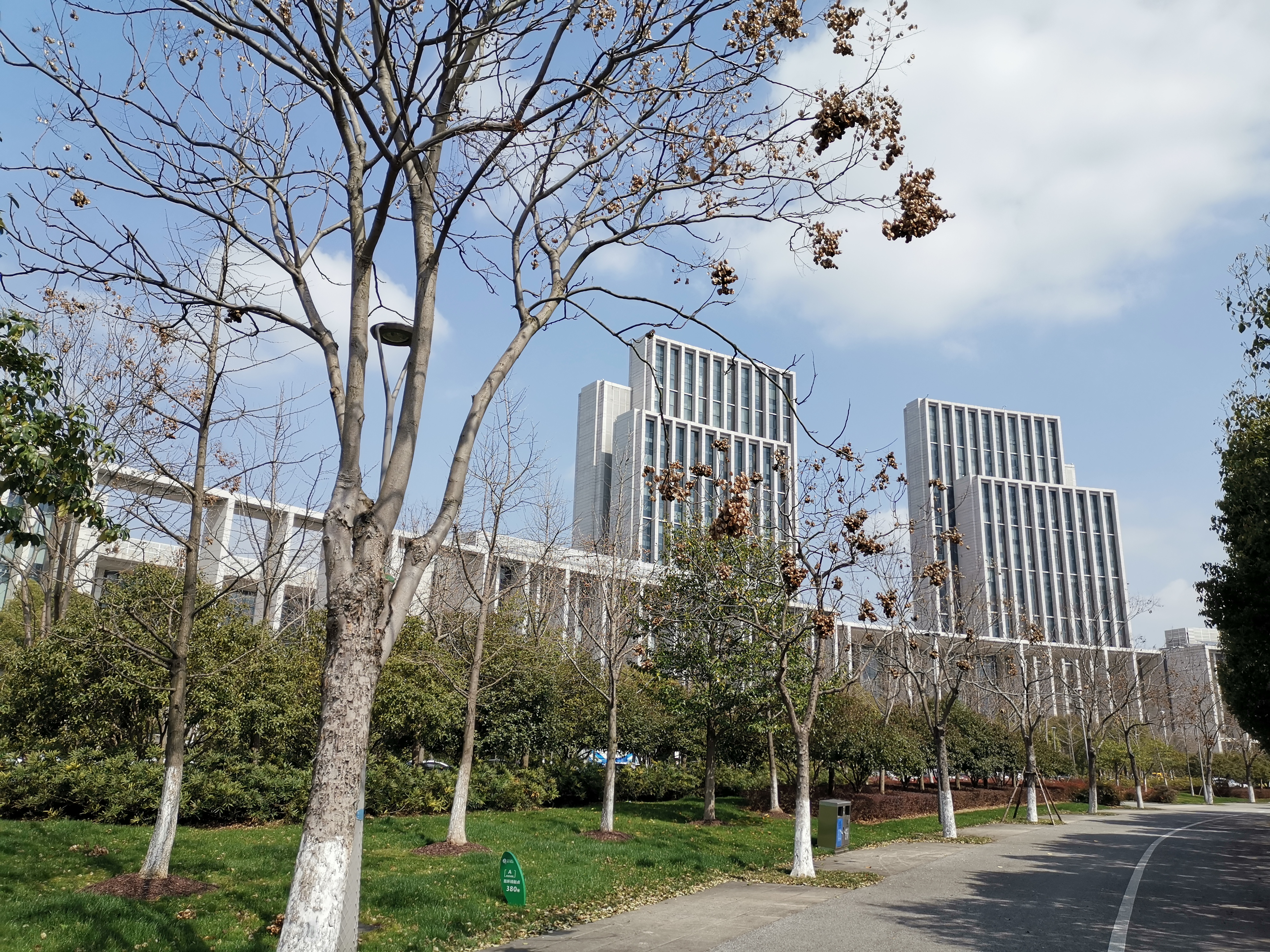
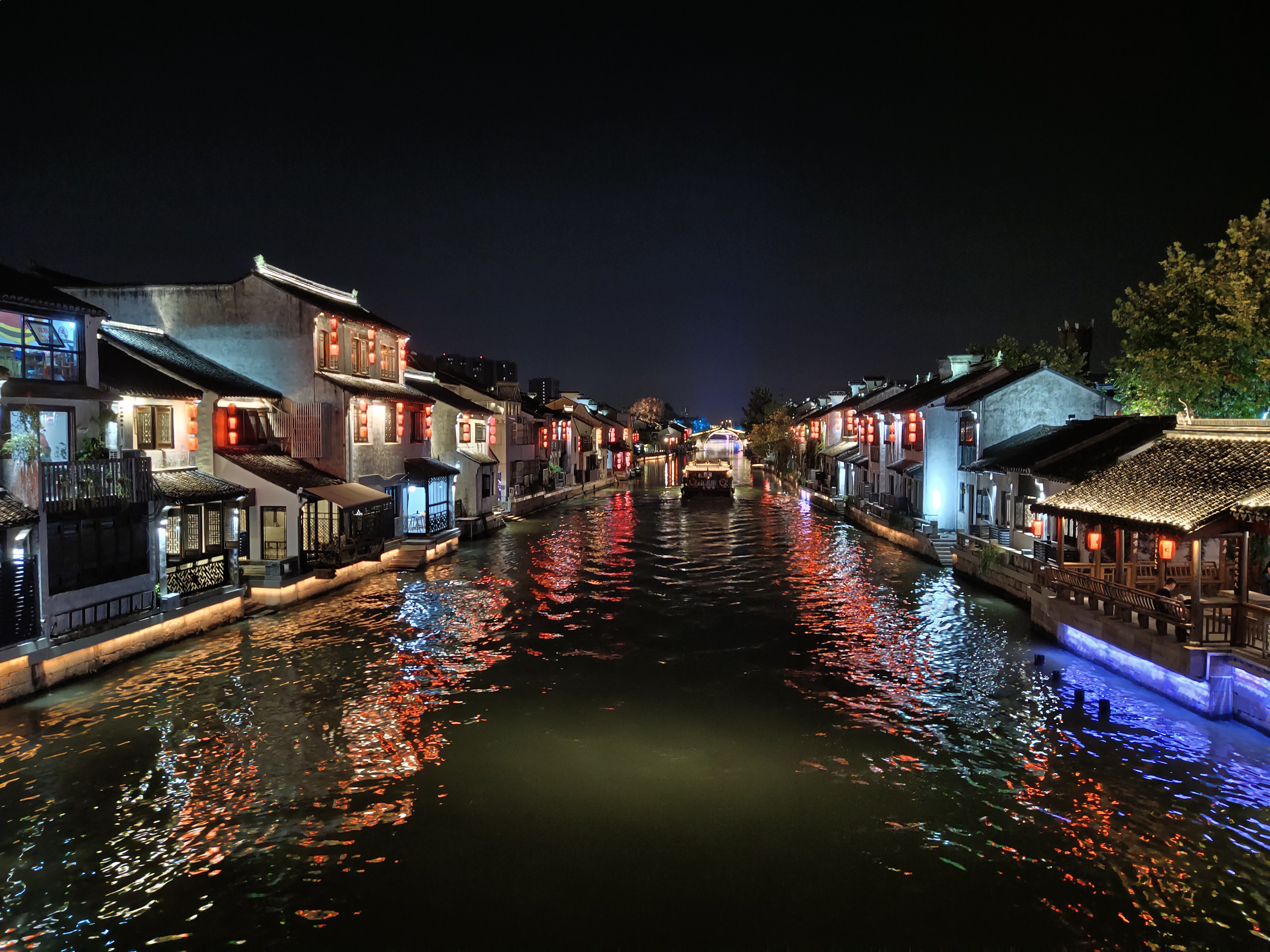
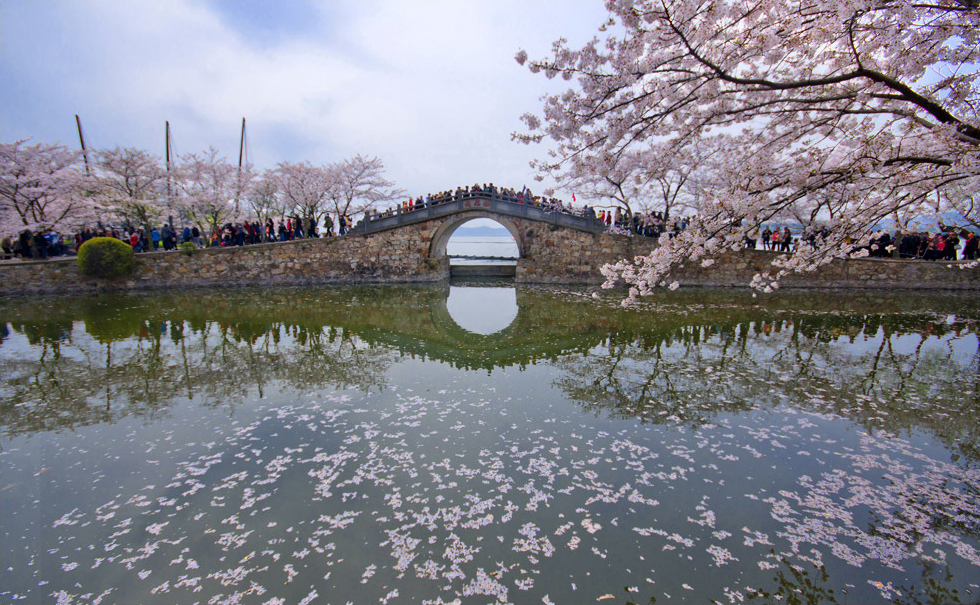
- Sanyang Plaza Former Site of Wuxi Library WUXI IFS Lingshan Grand Buddha Wuxi Taihu Lake Wuxi Municipal Government Nanchang Street Wuxi Taihu lake Changchun bridge
- Motto: Wuxi is full of warmth and water
- Location of Wuxi in Jiangsu

- Location within China
- Coordinates (Wuxi municipal government): 31°32′57″N 120°3′26″E
- Country: People's Republic of China
- Province: Jiangsu
- County-level divisions: 9
- Seat: Binhu District

Government
  - Type: Prefecture-level city
  - CCP Municipal Secretary: Jiang Feng
  - Acting Mayor: Cai JianFeng

Area
  - Prefecture-level city: 4,627.47 km^{2} (1,786.68 sq mi)
  - Land: 3,724.98 km^{2} (1,438.22 sq mi)
  - Water: 902.49 km^{2} (348.45 sq mi)
  - Urban: 1,643.89 km^{2} (634.71 sq mi)

Population (2024 estimate)
  - Prefecture-level city: 7,495,000
  - Density: 2,012/km^{2} (5,211/sq mi)
  - Urban: 6,715,559
  - Urban density: 4,085.16/km^{2} (10,580.5/sq mi)

GDP(2025)
  - Prefecture-level city: CN¥ 1.677 trillion US$ 240.8 billion
  - Per capita: CN¥ 223,802; US$ 32,127
- Time zone: UTC+8 (Beijing Time)
- Postal code: 214000
- Area code: 510
- ISO 3166 code: CN-JS-02
- City flower: Prunus mume
- City tree: Camphora
- Regional dialect: Wu: Wuxi dialect
- Website: www.wuxi.gov.cn

Wuxi
- "Wuxi" in Simplified (top) and Traditional (bottom) Chinese characters
- Simplified Chinese: 无锡
- Traditional Chinese: 無錫
- Wugniu: vu^{2} siq^{8}
- Postal: Wusih
Transcriptions
Standard Mandarin
- Hanyu Pinyin: Wúxī
- Bopomofo: ㄨˊ ㄒㄧ
- Wade–Giles: Wu2-hsi1
- Tongyong Pinyin: Wúsi
- Yale Romanization: Wúsyī
- MPS2: Wúshī
- IPA: [ǔ.ɕí]
Wu
- Wugniu: vu^{2} siq^{8}
- IPA: Shanghainese: [vu˨ ɕiɪʔ˧]
Yue: Cantonese
- Yale Romanization: Mòuhsek
- Jyutping: mou^{4} sek^{3}
- IPA: [mɔw˩.sɛk̚˧]
Southern Min
- Hokkien POJ: Bû-sek

Wuxi is a city in southern Jiangsu, China. As of 2024, it had a population of 7,495,000. The city lies in the southern Yangtze delta and borders Lake Tai. Notable landmarks include Lihu Park, the Mt. Lingshan Grand Buddha Scenic Area and its 88-meter (289 ft)-tall Grand Buddha at Ling Shan statue, Xihui Park, Wuxi Zoo, and the Wuxi Museum. Transportation options include Wuxi Shuofang Airport, Wuxi Metro, Shanghai–Nanjing intercity high-speed railway, and Beijing–Shanghai high-speed railway. Wuxi is home to Jiangnan University.

== Etymology ==
Wuxi's name can be read to mean "without (无; 無) tin (锡; 錫)". Despite the many folk origin stories for the name, many modern Chinese scholars favor the view that the word is derived from the "old Yue language" or, supposedly, the old Kra–Dai languages, rather than reflecting the presence of tin in the area.

== History ==
Clues are to be found at the Meili Museum and the Helv Relics Museum, Wuxi is the ancient capital of Wu State during the Spring and Autumn Period (770–476 BCE). Taibo and Zhongyong traveled southeast and settled in Wuxi Meili. There, Taibo and his followers set up the State of Wu, and made Wuxi as its founding capital which lasted for 600 years. The history of Wuxi can be traced back to Shang dynasty (1600–1046 BC). The tin industry thrived in the area in ancient times but it was eventually depleted, so that when Wuxi was established in 202 BCE during the Han dynasty, it was named "Wuxi" (the capital of Wu commandery). Administratively, Wuxi became a district of Biling (later Changzhou) and only during the Yuan dynasty (1206–1368) did it become an independent prefecture. Wuxi and Changzhou are considered to be the birthplaces of modern industrialization in China.

Agriculture and the silk industry flourished in Wuxi and the town became a transportation hub under the early Tang Dynasty after the opening of the Grand Canal in 609. It became known as one of the biggest markets for rice in China.

The Donglin Academy, originally founded during the Song dynasty (960–1279) was restored in Wuxi in 1604. Not a school, it served as a public forum, advocating a Confucian orthodoxy and ethics. Many of its academicians were retired court officials or officials deposed in the 1590s due to factionalism.

As a populous county, its eastern part was separated and made into Jinkui County in 1724. Both Wuxi and Jinkui were utterly devastated by the Taiping Rebellion, which resulted in nearly 2/3 of their population being killed. The number of "able-bodied males" (ding, 丁) were only 72,053 and 138,008 individuals in 1865, versus 339,549 and 258,934 in 1830.

During the Qing dynasty (1644–1912), cotton and silk production flourished in Wuxi. Trade increased with the opening of ports to Shanghai in 1842, and Zhenjiang and Nanjing in 1858. Wuxi became a center of the textile industry in China. Textile mills were built in 1894 and silk reeling establishments known as "filatures" were built in 1904. Wuxi has remained the regional center for the waterborne transport of grain. The opening of the railways to Shanghai and to the cities of Zhenjiang and Nanjing to the northwest in 1908 further increased the exports of rice from the area. Jinkui County merged into Wuxi County with the onset of the Republic in 1912. Many agricultural laborers and merchants moved to Shanghai in the late 19th century and early 20th century; some prospered in the new factories. After World War II, Wuxi's importance as an economic center diminished, but it remains a regional manufacturing hub. Tourism has increasingly become important. On 23 April 1949, Wuxi was divided into Wuxi City and Wuxi County, and it became a provincial city in 1953 when Jiangsu Province was founded. In March 1995, several administrative changes were made within Wuxi City and Wuxi County to accommodate for Wuxi New District, with the creation of 19 administrative villages such as Shuofang, Fangqian, Xin'an and Meicun. [Jiangnan University was founded in 1902 and merged with two other colleges in 2001 to form its modern iteration.”

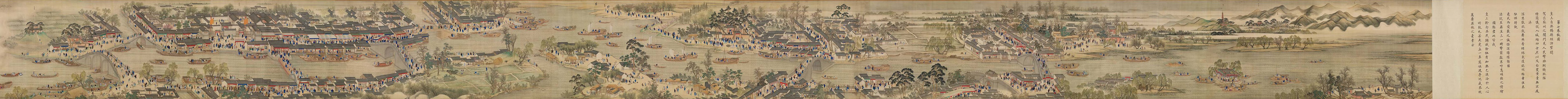
Qing-era depiction of Wuxi

== Climate ==
Climate data for Wuxi, elevation 3 m (9.8 ft), (1991–2020 normals, extremes 1955–present)
Month	Jan	Feb	Mar	Apr	May	Jun	Jul	Aug	Sep	Oct	Nov	Dec	Year
Record high °C (°F)	22.1 (71.8)	26.8 (80.2)	33.1 (91.6)	34.8 (94.6)	35.3 (95.5)	38.1 (100.6)	40.6 (105.1)	41.2 (106.2)	37.7 (99.9)	33.1 (91.6)	29.8 (85.6)	23.6 (74.5)	41.2 (106.2)
Mean daily maximum °C (°F)	7.8 (46.0)	10.2 (50.4)	14.9 (58.8)	21.0 (69.8)	26.2 (79.2)	28.9 (84.0)	32.8 (91.0)	32.3 (90.1)	28.2 (82.8)	23.1 (73.6)	17.2 (63.0)	10.6 (51.1)	21.1 (70.0)
Daily mean °C (°F)	3.9 (39.0)	6.0 (42.8)	10.2 (50.4)	16.0 (60.8)	21.4 (70.5)	24.9 (76.8)	28.9 (84.0)	28.3 (82.9)	24.2 (75.6)	18.6 (65.5)	12.6 (54.7)	6.3 (43.3)	16.8 (62.2)
Mean daily minimum °C (°F)	0.9 (33.6)	2.6 (36.7)	6.4 (43.5)	11.7 (53.1)	17.2 (63.0)	21.6 (70.9)	25.7 (78.3)	25.3 (77.5)	20.9 (69.6)	14.9 (58.8)	8.9 (48.0)	2.9 (37.2)	13.3 (55.9)
Record low °C (°F)	−11.8 (10.8)	−12.5 (9.5)	−3.5 (25.7)	0.7 (33.3)	8.7 (47.7)	11.6 (52.9)	18.4 (65.1)	18.3 (64.9)	11.7 (53.1)	2.8 (37.0)	−3.2 (26.2)	−8.0 (17.6)	−12.5 (9.5)
Average precipitation mm (inches)	66.3 (2.61)	61.7 (2.43)	83.6 (3.29)	84.5 (3.33)	95.4 (3.76)	210.6 (8.29)	180.8 (7.12)	173.9 (6.85)	92.1 (3.63)	58.4 (2.30)	59.3 (2.33)	40.8 (1.61)	1,207.4 (47.55)
Average precipitation days (≥ 0.1 mm)	10.2	9.9	11.4	10.5	11.2	13.3	12.1	12.6	8.8	7.9	8.5	7.7	124.1
Average snowy days	3.0	2.0	0.8	0.1	0	0	0	0	0	0	0.2	0.9	7
Average relative humidity (%)	74	74	71	70	70	77	77	78	77	74	75	72	74
Mean monthly sunshine hours	123.0	124.0	145.8	171.0	181.4	136.7	189.5	185.4	161.9	162.4	140.3	139.0	1,860.4
Percentage possible sunshine	38	40	39	44	43	32	44	46	44	47	45	45	42
Source: China Meteorological Administration all-time extreme temperatureall-time Jan and Feb (and all-time record in the case of Feb) extreme lowAll-time September high

== Administrative divisions ==
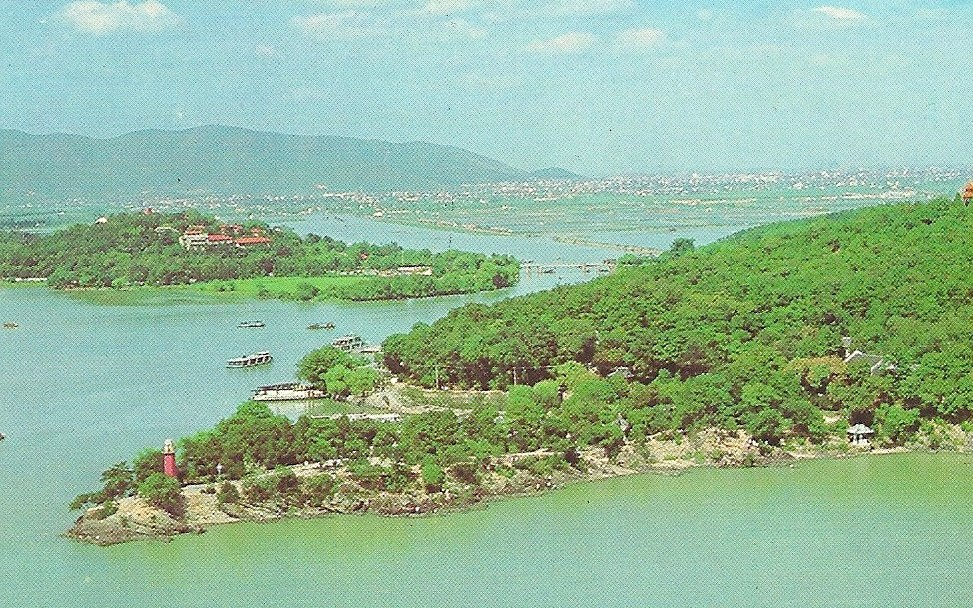
View of Turtle Head Island in 1987

The prefecture-level city of Wuxi administers seven county-level divisions, including 5 districts and 2 county-level cities. The information here presented uses the metric system and data from the 2020 Census.

These districts are sub-divided into 73 township-level divisions, including 59 towns and 24 subdistricts.

Map
Subdivision	Chinese	Hanyu Pinyin	Population (2020)	Area (km^{2})	Density (/km^{2})
City Proper
Liangxi District	梁溪区	Liángxī Qū	985,465	73.29	13,446
Suburban
Xishan District	锡山区	Xīshān Qū	882,387	395.9	2,229
Huishan District	惠山区	Huìshān Qū	893,675	321.5	2,780
Binhu District	滨湖区	Bīnhú Qū	915,093	620.4	1,475
Xinwu District	新吴区	Xīnwú Qū	720,215	209.9	3,431
Satellite cities (County-level cities)
Jiangyin City	江阴市	Jiāngyīn Shì	1,779,515	987.4	1,802
Yixing City	宜兴市	Yíxīng Shì	1,285,785	2,010	639.7
Total			7,462,135	4,618	1,616
Defunct: Chong'an District, Nanchang District, & Beitang District

== Economy ==
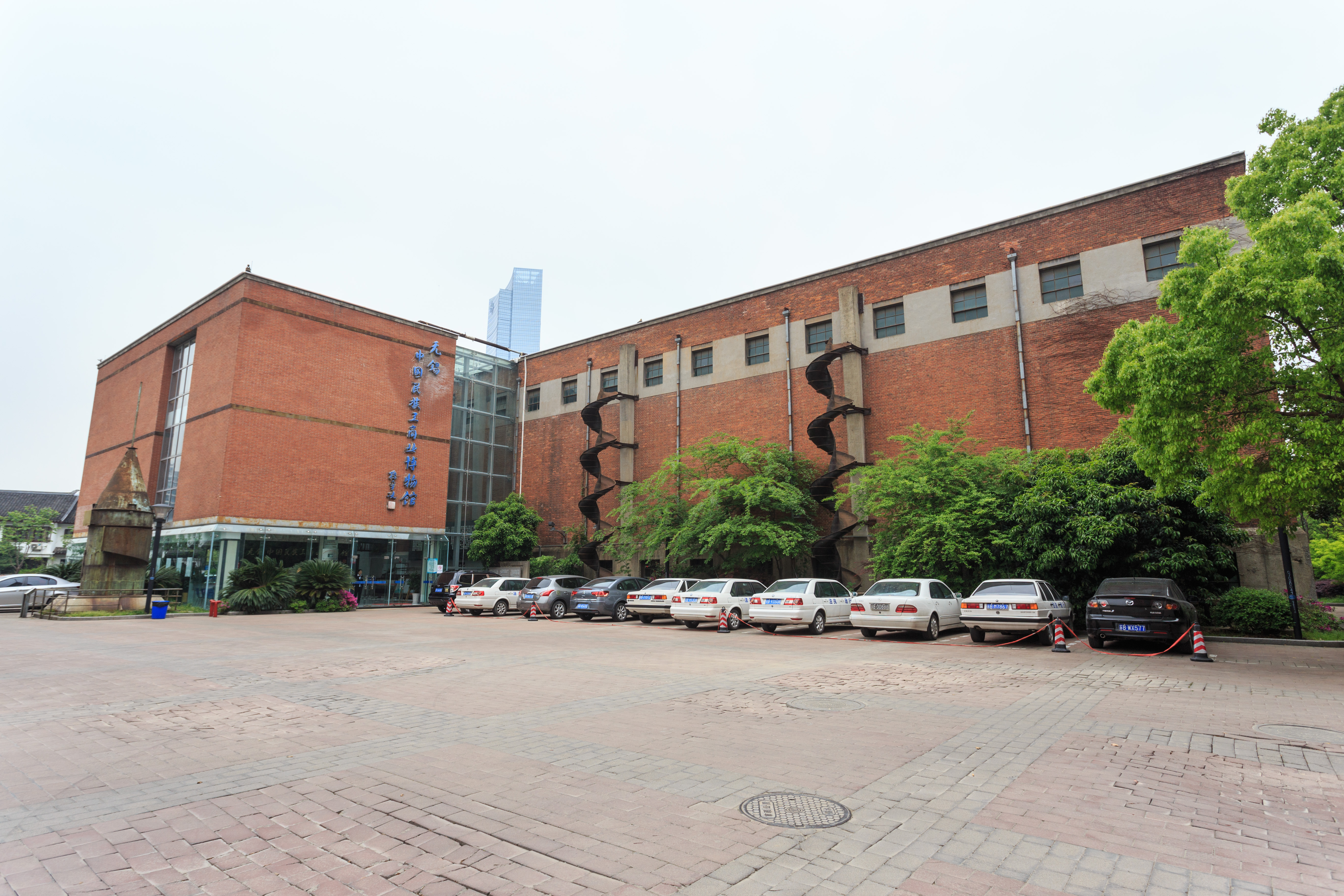
Wuxi Ethnic Industry and Commerce Museum

Wuxi has a relatively developed economy since ancient times. In 1895, Yang Zonglian and Yang Zonghan founded the first national capital enterprise, Yeqin Cotton Mill, outside the south gate of Wuxi. Subsequently, many enterprises with textile, silk and grain processing industries as the main body were born and developed rapidly. Wuxi became One of the birthplaces of national industry and commerce. During this process, many "firsts" and "most" in the history of Wuxi's modern industrial development were born; batches of industrial and commercial giants including the Rong family and the Tang family were born, and it also demonstrated the entrepreneurship of Wuxi's national industrial and commercial entrepreneurs. After the reform and opening up, private enterprises in Wuxi developed vigorously on the basis of the southern Jiangsu model represented by township industries. Well-known companies such as "Technology" all transformed during this period. And since July 1993, Taiji Industry was the first private enterprise listed on the Shanghai Stock Exchange as a listed company in Jiangsu Province. Over the years, the scale of listed companies from Wuxi has gradually expanded, forming a relatively unique "Wuxi plate", ranking first in Jiangsu Province. First, it plays an increasingly important role in the economic development of the entire Yangtze River Delta.

After the reform and opening up, Wuxi has gradually become an important economic center in the east and a very dynamic commercial city with the opportunity brought by the Southern Jiangsu model. At the end of 2013, Wuxi became one of China's "new first-tier cities" selected by "First Financial Weekly" due to its stable comprehensive strength; at the same time, "2013 Best Commercial Cities in Mainland China" released by the Chinese version of "Forbes" Among them, Wuxi ranks fifth, ranking first among prefecture-level cities.

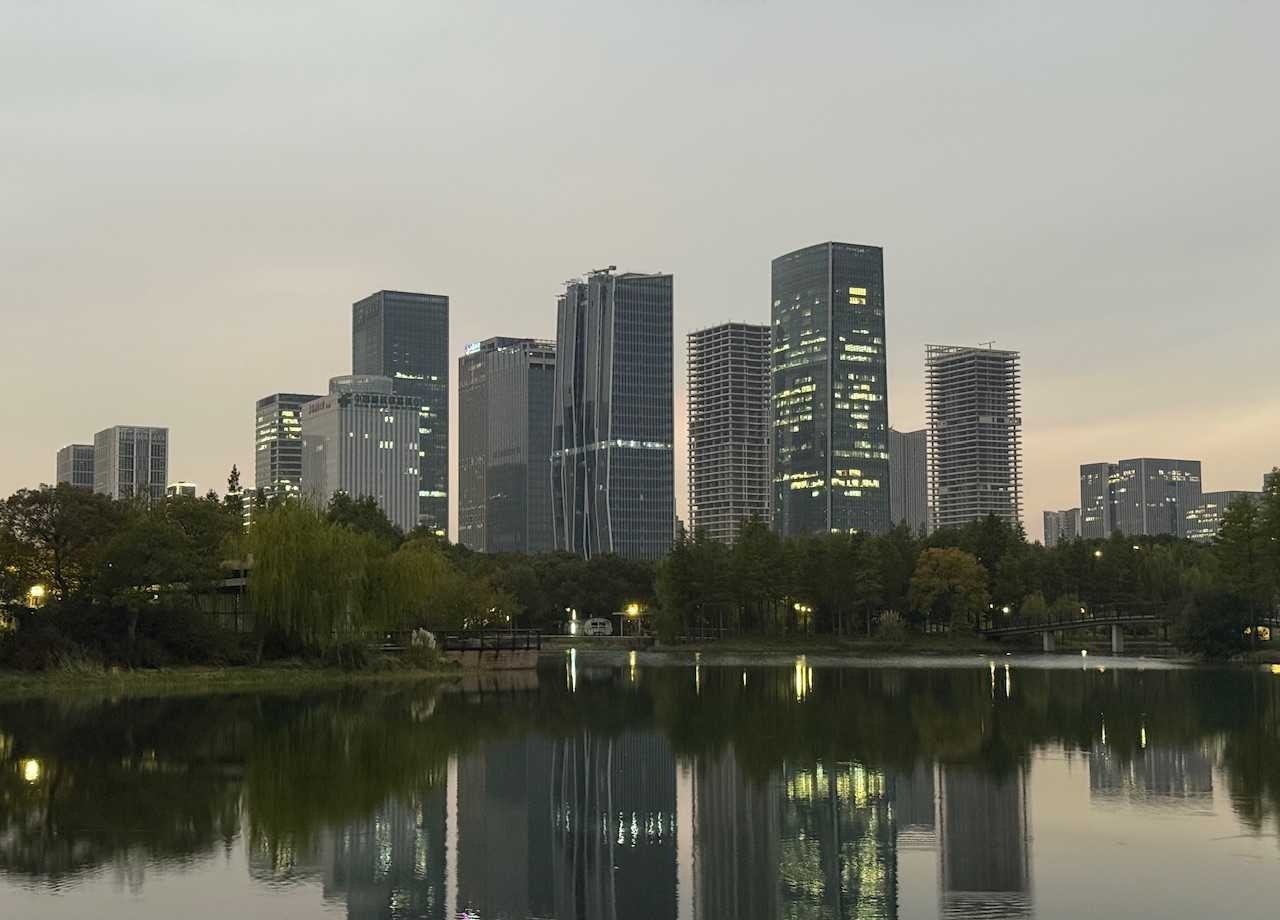
Lake Tai New City（under construction）

In terms of industry, the added value of the city's primary industry was 13.365 billion yuan, an increase of 1.1% over the previous year; the added value of the secondary industry was 717.739 billion yuan, an increase of 3.6% over the previous year; The growth rate of the previous year was 2.4%; the ratio of the three industries was adjusted to 0.9 : 48.3 : 50.8.

A total of 158,100 new jobs were created in cities and towns throughout the year, of which 77,200 laid-off and unemployed people in various cities and towns were reemployed, and 31,200 people who had difficulties in finding jobs were reemployed. The city's urban registered unemployment rate was 2.68%. The added value of the private economy in the whole year was 983.124 billion yuan, an increase of 3.3% over the previous year, accounting for 66.2% of the total economic output, an increase of 0.2 percentage points over the previous year. The output value of privately owned industries above designated size was 1,426.928 billion yuan, an increase of 12.8% over the previous year. Private investment was 240.341 billion yuan, down 3.6% from the previous year.

At the end of the year, 423,300 enterprises of various types were registered by the registration authorities at all levels in the city, including 36,000 state-owned and collective holding companies, 7,000 foreign-invested enterprises, and 380,400 private enterprises. At the end of the year, there were 660,900 self-employed households, and 80,800 newly registered households that year.

The annual urban consumer price index (CPI) rose by 2.1%, an increase of 0.4 percentage points over the previous year. Among them, the price of service items increased by 1.0%, and the price of consumer goods increased by 2.9%. The increase in the price of industrial production was stable. The ex-factory price of industrial producers rose by 1.7% and the purchasing price of industrial producers rose by 3.9%. Since it was established in 1992, Wuxi New District (WND), covering an area of 220 square kilometers (85 sq mi), has evolved to be one of the major industrial parks in China. In 2013, it had a GDP of 121.3 billion yuan ($19.54 billion), and an industrial output value of 276.7 billion yuan, accounting for 15% of production in the Wuxi area.The district includes the Wuxi Hi-tech Industrial Development Zone, Wuxi (Taihu) International Technology Park, Wuxi Airport Industrial Park, China (Wuxi) Industrial Expo Park, China Wu Culture Expo Park, and International Education and Living Community. Hotels in Wuxi include Wuxi Maoye City – Marriott Hotel, Hilton Hotel's Wuxi-Lingshan Double Tree Resort near the Lingshan Giant Buddha, Kempinski Hotel Wuxi, Landison Square Hotel Wuxi, noted for its Wu jade phoenix sculpture in the lobby, Radisson Blu Resort Wetland Park Wuxi, Sheraton Wuxi Binhu Hotel, the Wuxi Grand Hotel, and Wuxi Hubin Hotel and many other hotels.

In 2025, the city's GDP reached 1,677.394 billion yuan, a year-on-year increase of 5.1% at constant prices. Specifically, the added value of the primary industry was 14.248 billion yuan, a year-on-year increase of 2.6%; the added value of the secondary industry was 787.047 billion yuan, an increase of 5.0%; and the added value of the tertiary industry was 876.099 billion yuan, an increase of 5.1%. Fiscal revenue reached 122.5 billion yuan, ranking third in the province. Per capita GDP was 223,000 yuan, ranking third in the country after Beijing and Shanghai.

== Commercial facilities ==
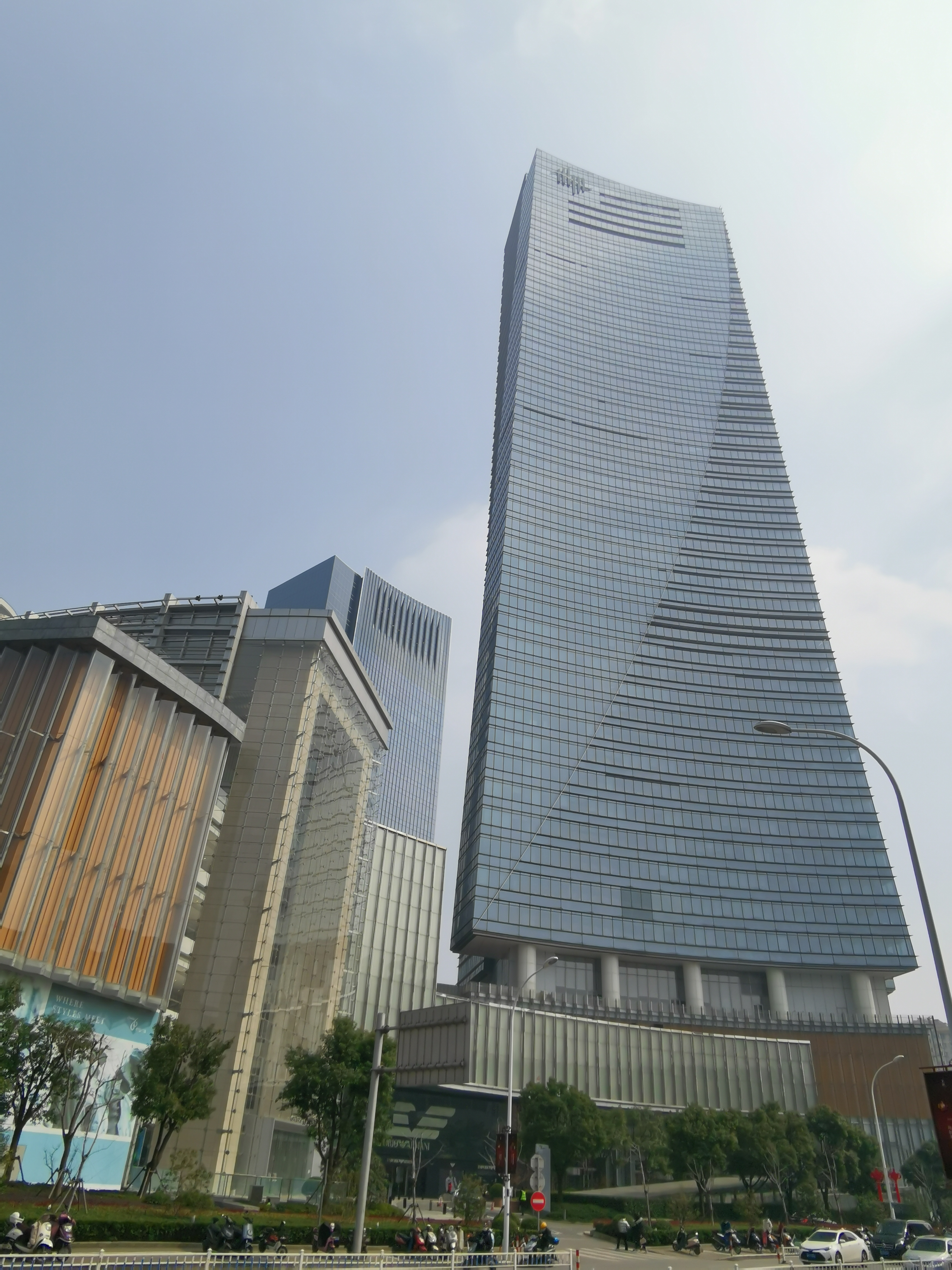
Center 66

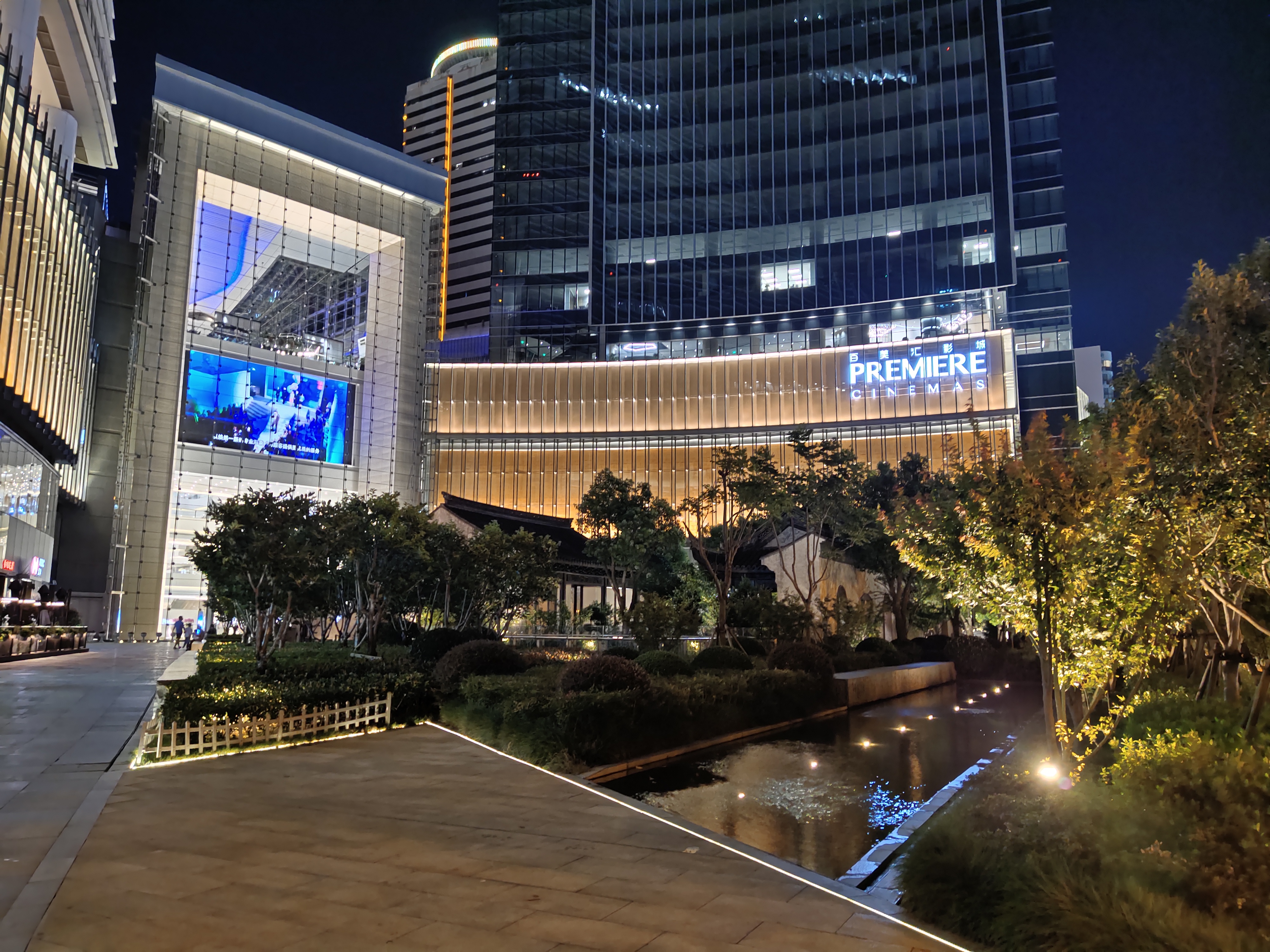
Center 66

As an important commercial center in East China, it has always been famous for its unique geographical location and historical background. Wuxi's commercial development has a long and prosperous history, and it has played a vital role in the local economic and social development.

The earliest commercial development in Wuxi can be traced back to the Spring and Autumn Period and the Warring States Period, when commercial activities were already carried out here. With the evolution of history, Wuxi has gradually become a transportation hub and commercial center in the Jiangnan area. Wuxi is located on the shore of Taihu Lake and has convenient transportation. It has been a distribution center for silk, tea, rice and other commodities since ancient times. Today, Wuxi Commerce has developed into a diversified economic system dominated by service industries and high-tech industries.

There are many characteristics and advantages of Wuxi business. First of all, its geographical location is superior, located in the center of the Yangtze River Delta, and the transportation is convenient, which is conducive to the circulation of commodities. Secondly, Wuxi has rich natural resources and cultural heritage, which provides unique conditions for commercial development. In addition, the Wuxi municipal government has been committed to optimizing the business environment, attracting many domestic and foreign investors and entrepreneurs to invest and start businesses.

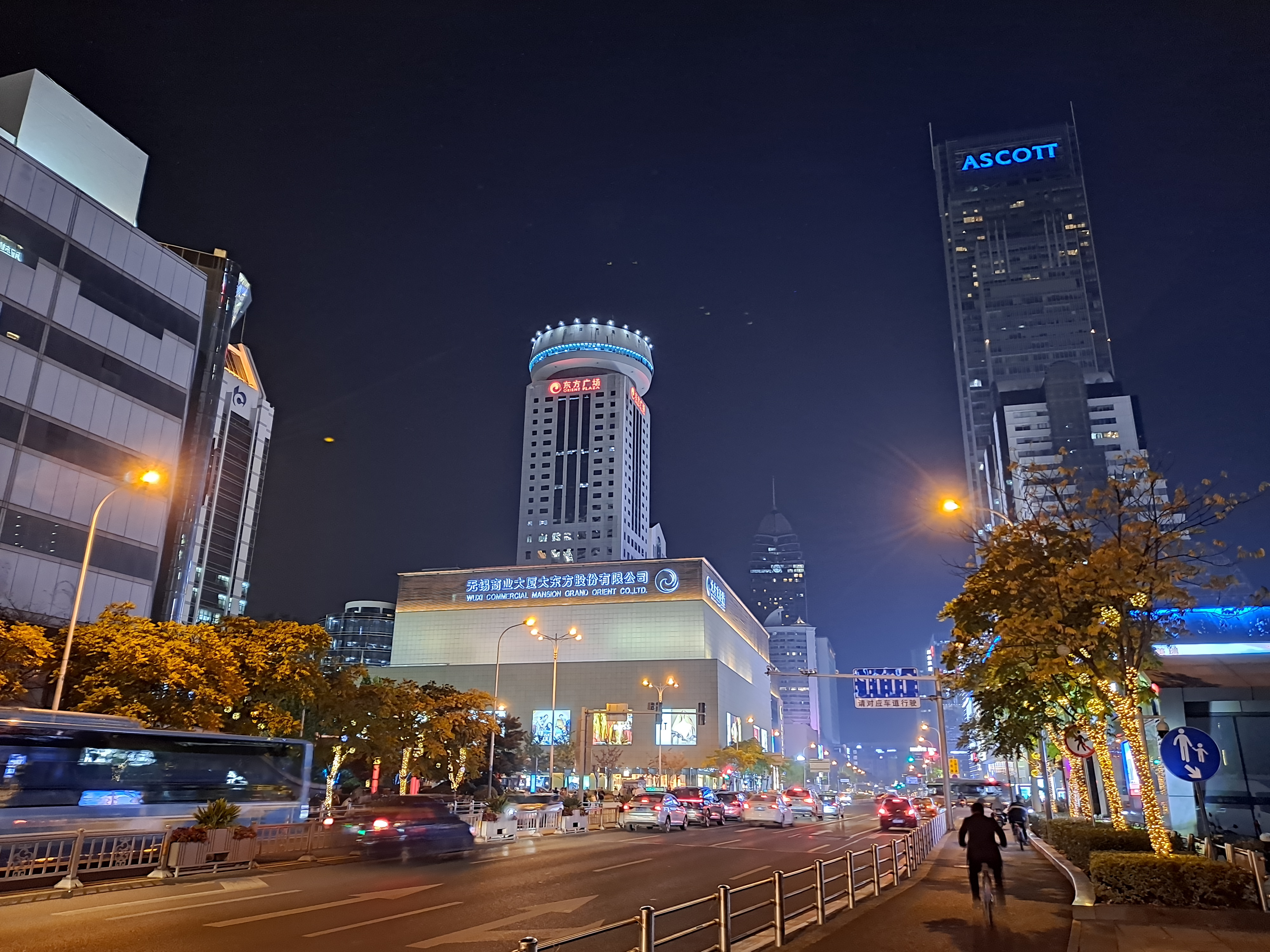
Great Oriental Department Store

Now Wuxi is a regional business hub, with extensive manufacturing and large industrial parks devoted to new industries. Historically a center of textile manufacturing, the city has adopted new industries such as electric motor manufacturing, MRP software development, bicycle and brake manufacturing, and solar technology, with two major photovoltaic companies, Suntech Power and Jetion Holdings Ltd, based in Wuxi. Wuxi Pharma Tech, a major pharmaceutical company, is based in Wuxi. The city has a rapidly developing skyline with the opening of three supertall skyscrapers in 2014: Wuxi IFS (339 meters (1,112 ft)), Wuxi Suning Plaza 1 (328 meters (1,076 ft)) and Wuxi Maoye City - Marriott Hotel (303.8 meters (997 ft)).

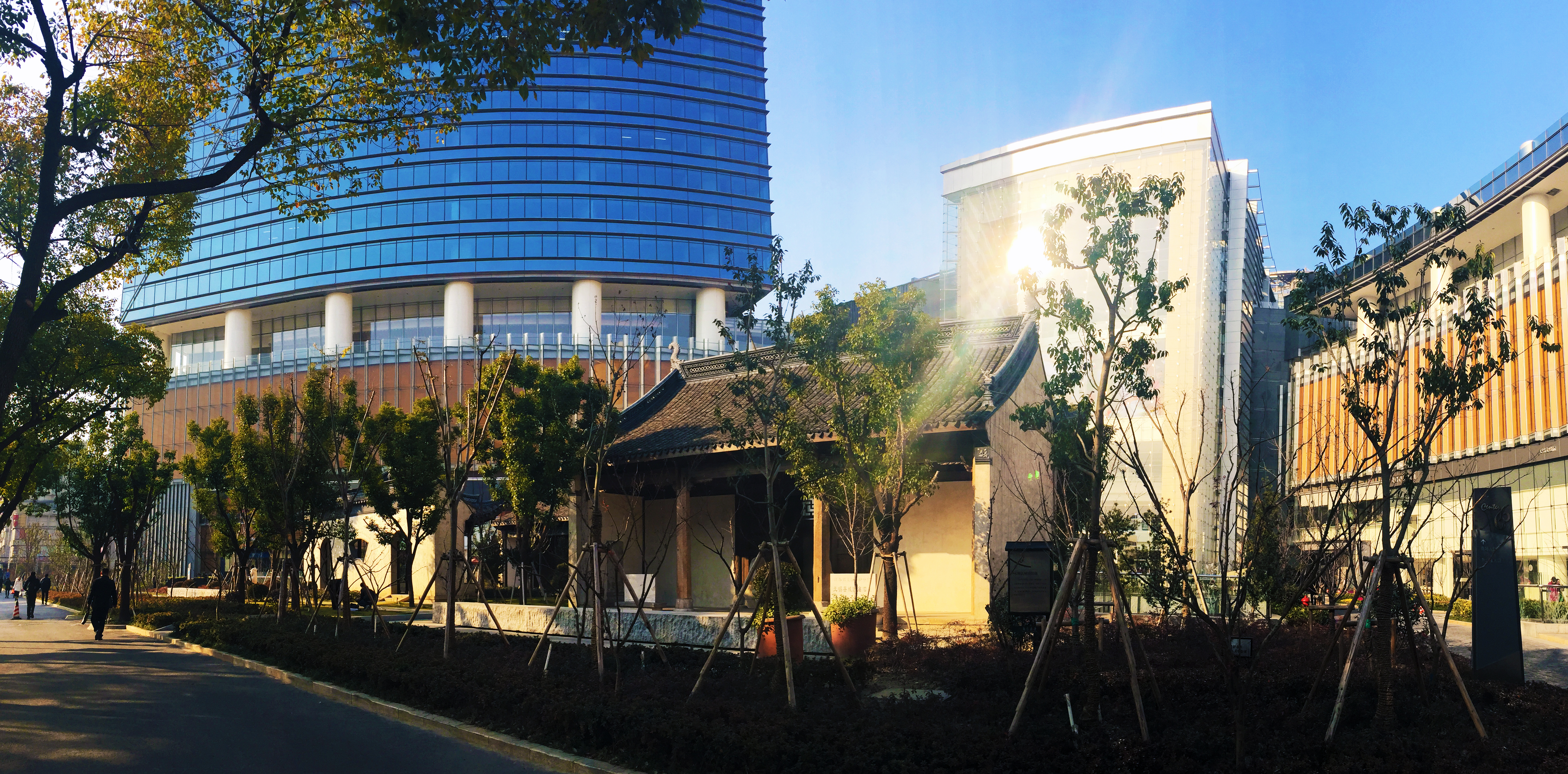
Center 66

Wuxi's commercial area is concentrated along Zhongshan Road in Liangxi District. On this road, Maoye Department Store, Hongdou Wanhua City, Great Oriental Department Store, Suning Plaza, Center 66, Yaohan, Parkson and other Chinese and foreign commercial retail enterprises gather. Chong'an Temple, Nanchan Temple, and Nanchang Street are three traditional commercial bazaars. Among them, Chong'an Temple Block is as famous as Shanghai Town God's Temple, Nanjing Confucius Temple, and Suzhou Xuanmiao Temple, which are also formed by temple bazaars.

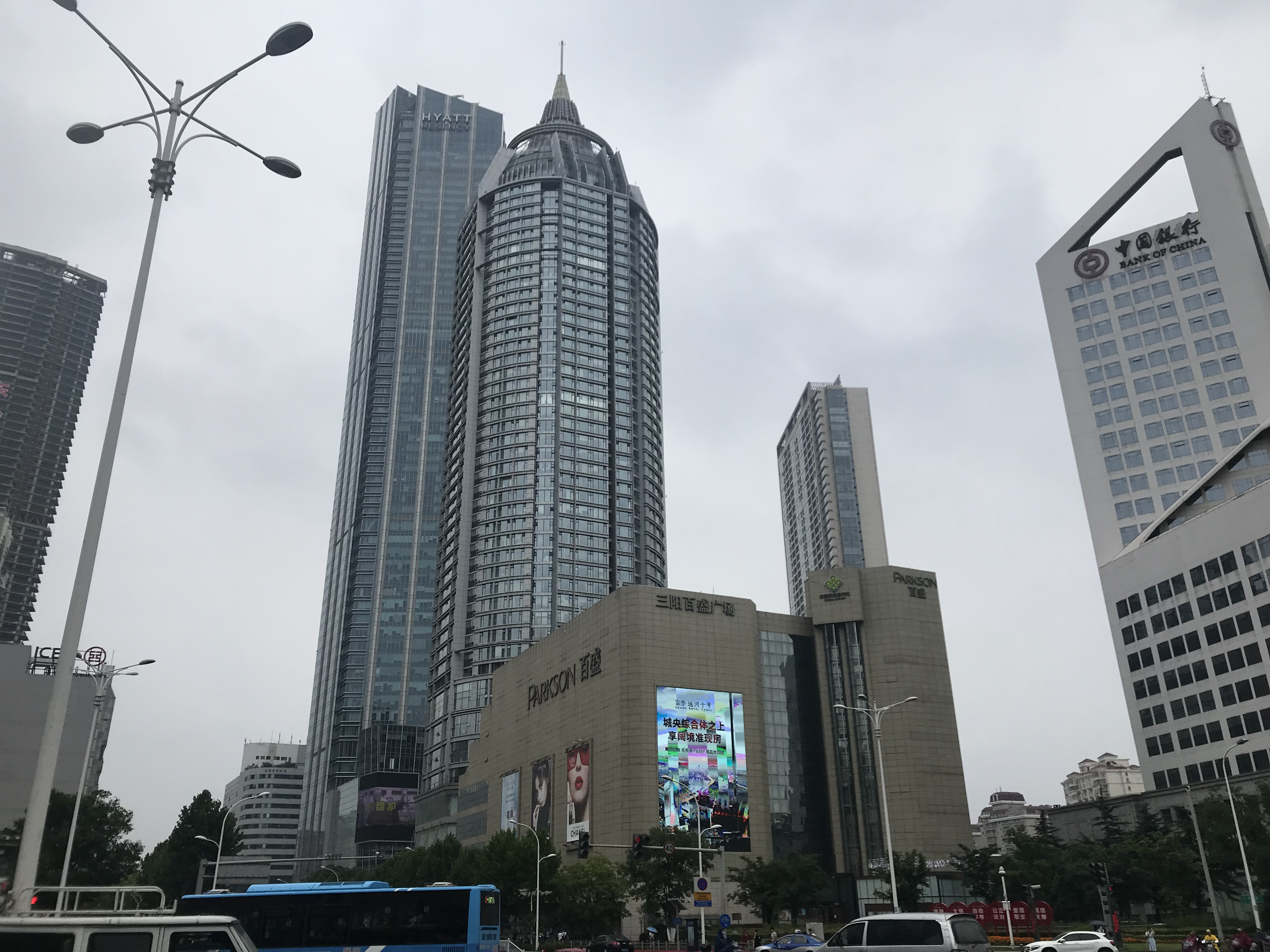
Sanyang Plaza

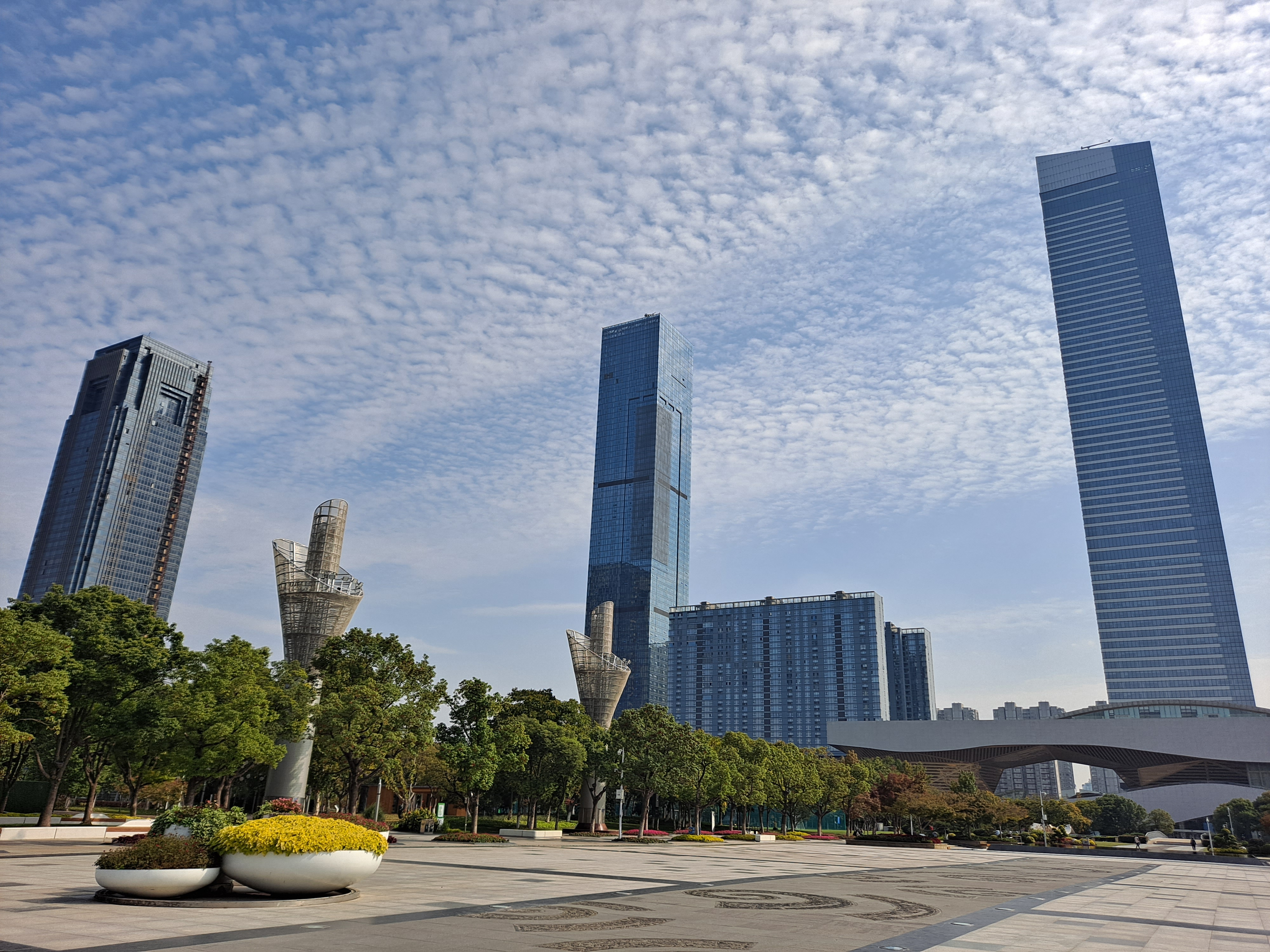
Taihu Square

Since the establishment of Yaohan, the first Sino-foreign joint venture retail enterprise in Jiangsu Province in 1996, and the establishment of Metro, China's second foreign-funded hypermarket, in Wuxi in 1997, the concentration of foreign-funded commercial retail in Wuxi is second only to Shanghai in the Yangtze River Delta region. Today, it includes Center 66, Great Orient Department Store, Wuxi Yaohan, IKEA Gathering, Yaohan Center, Bailian Outlets, Apple Direct Store, Mixc City, Coastal City, Maoye Department Store, a large number of Wanda Plazas and Rong Commercial retail benchmarking enterprises such as Chuangmao and Outlets Chuanzhisha still maintain their uniqueness in Jiangsu Province or in the Yangtze River Delta region, thus establishing Wuxi as one of the major center cities in Jiangsu Province and the Yangtze River Delta region.

== Transportation ==
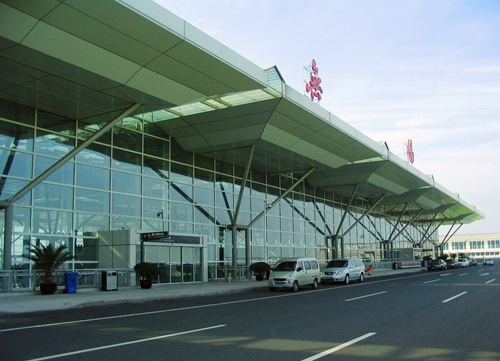
Wuxi Shuofang Airport

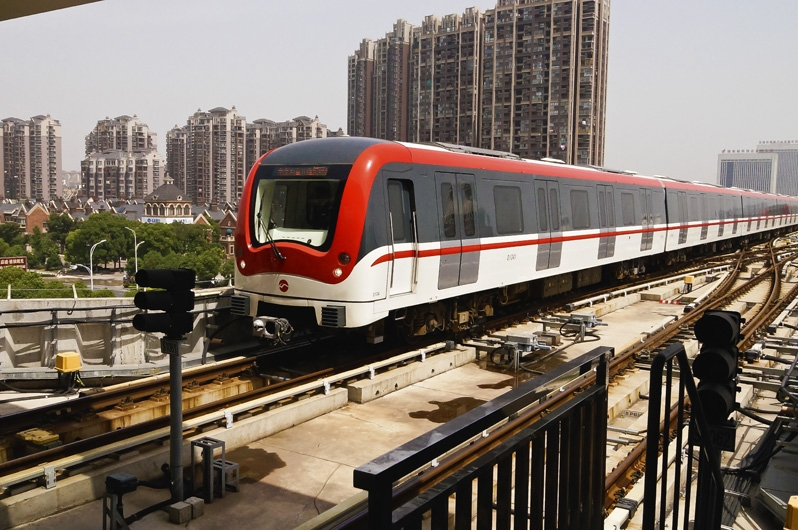
Wuxi Metro

- Wuxi Railway Station is situated on the Shanghai–Nanjing Intercity High-Speed Railway, a 301 kilometers (187 mi) railway which opened on 1 July 2010, linking it directly with the provincial capital of Nanjing, Shanghai and Suzhou.
- Wuxi Metro is an urban rail transit system serving Wuxi City, Jiangsu Province, China. Its first line, Wuxi Metro Line 1, was officially opened for operation on 1 July 2014, making Wuxi the 22nd metropolitan area in mainland China. It is the third city in Jiangsu Province to open rail transit.As of January 2024, there are 5 Wuxi Metro operating lines, namely Wuxi Metro Line 1, Wuxi Metro Line 2, Wuxi Metro Line 3 Phase I, Wuxi Metro Line 4 Phase I, Wuxi Metro Line S1, They are all subway lines with an operating mileage of 145 kilometers and a total of 97 stations.As of January 2024, there are 4 lines under construction in Wuxi Metro, namely Wuxi Metro Line 4 Phase II, Wuxi Metro Line 5 Phase I, Wuxi Metro Line 6 Phase I, and Wuxi Metro Line S2, with a total of about 120 km.On 21 January 2024, the daily passenger flow of the Wuxi subway network reached a record high of 1.3 million passengers. On 16 February 2024, the Wuxi subway network carried 1.4112 million passengers, a record high.
- Wuxi Shuofang Airport, situated 14 kilometers (8.7 mi) from the city center, opened in 2004, and has direct flights to Beijing, Guangzhou, Shenzhen, Hong Kong, Taipei, Singapore, and Osaka.

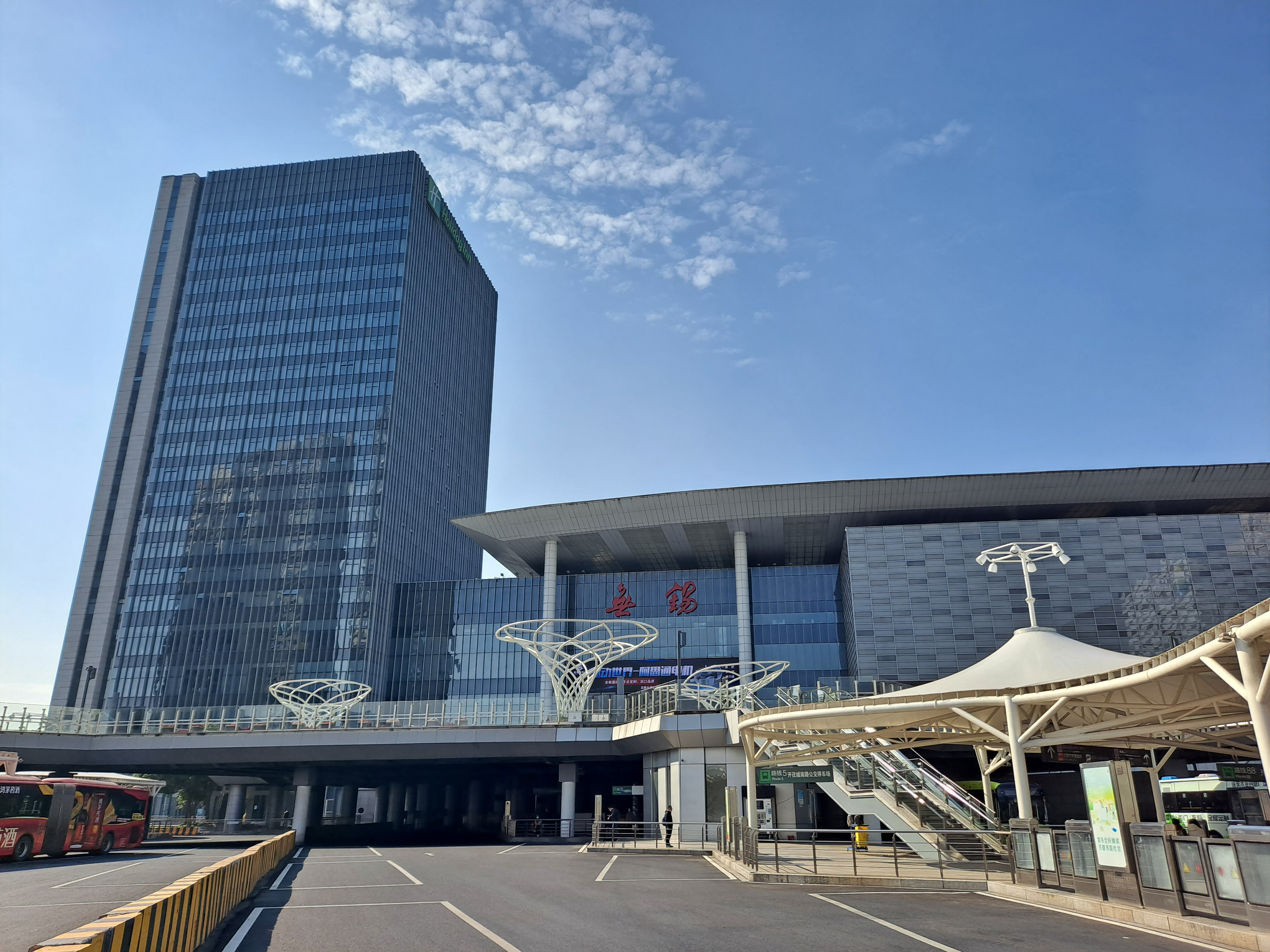
Wuxi Railway Station

- Wuxi lies along China National Highway 312 which connects Shanghai to central and northwestern China. The 274 kilometers (170 mi) Shanghai-Nanjing Expressway (G42), which opened in November 1996, connecting it to Shanghai, Suzhou, Changzhou, Zhenjiang and other cities in Jiangsu province. The 62.3 kilometers (38.7 mi) Wuxi-Yixing Expressway connects Wuxi with Yixing within the regional prefecture-level area.
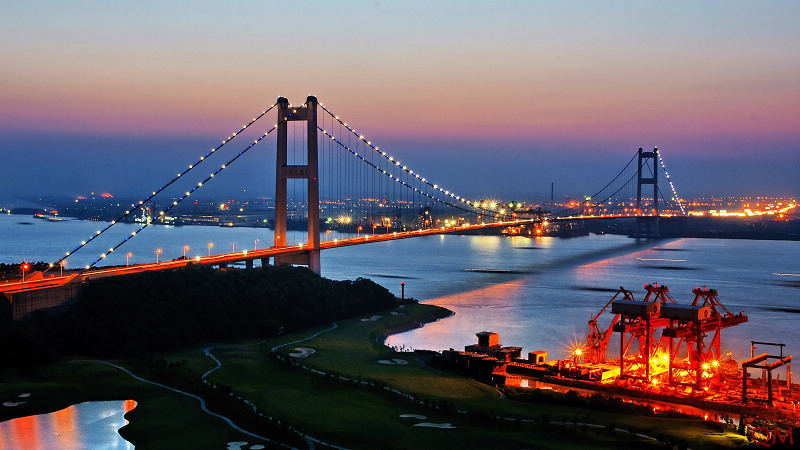
- Jiangyin
  Wuxi Jiangyin Port has 12 berths, mainly distributed in Shenxia Port Area, all of which have passed the open acceptance for foreign ships, with a total area of 1.5 million square meters, which are operated by Dagang Branch and Dacheng Branch respectively. Dagang Branch has a yard area of 710,000 square meters, and has two large warehouses with an area of 12,000 square meters each, each equipped with two 20-ton cranes. There are 10 dock berths, and the front of the dock maintains a water depth of -15 meters all year round. Among them, there are two 50,000-ton and 100,000-ton ocean-going berths, and one 2,000-ton sea-going berth, equipped with 9 gantry cranes with a lifting capacity of 40T, which can complete the cargo of arriving ships below 100,000 tons Unloading and transfer operations. There are also four 5,000-ton inland berths with a total length of 536 meters, equipped with multiple portal cranes and loading belt conveyors for port dredging. The port area is equipped with 7 120–150 ton truck scales and 2 gantry cranes. The warehouse has a maximum storage capacity of 3 million tons. It is mainly responsible for the unloading, storage and transfer of metal ore, coal and some general cargo. In order to meet the needs of customers, Dagang Branch also has ore screening and crushing equipment. After crushing, it can be directly conveyed to the vibrating screen for screening by the belt conveyor. The screen aperture can be adjusted according to the needs of different customers, and the production and processing can form lump ore and fine ore, with an annual output of 800,000-1 million tons. Dagang Branch has also launched three-condition general cargo liner routes from Jiangyin to the Middle East, Thailand and South Korea. Dacheng Branch was completed and put into operation in 2015.
- Wuxi Public Transport refers to the urban road public transportation system serving Wuxi City, Jiangsu Province, China. Its first line was opened in 1927. As of 2020, Wuxi Public Transport has 297 bus lines with a length of 5,760 kilometers and 3,036 operating vehicles. In 2020, the annual passenger volume of Wuxi public transport will be 191.18 million passenger.

== Education and research ==
Wuxi is also a major city among the top 200 cities in the world by scientific research outputs, as tracked by the Nature Index.

=== University ===
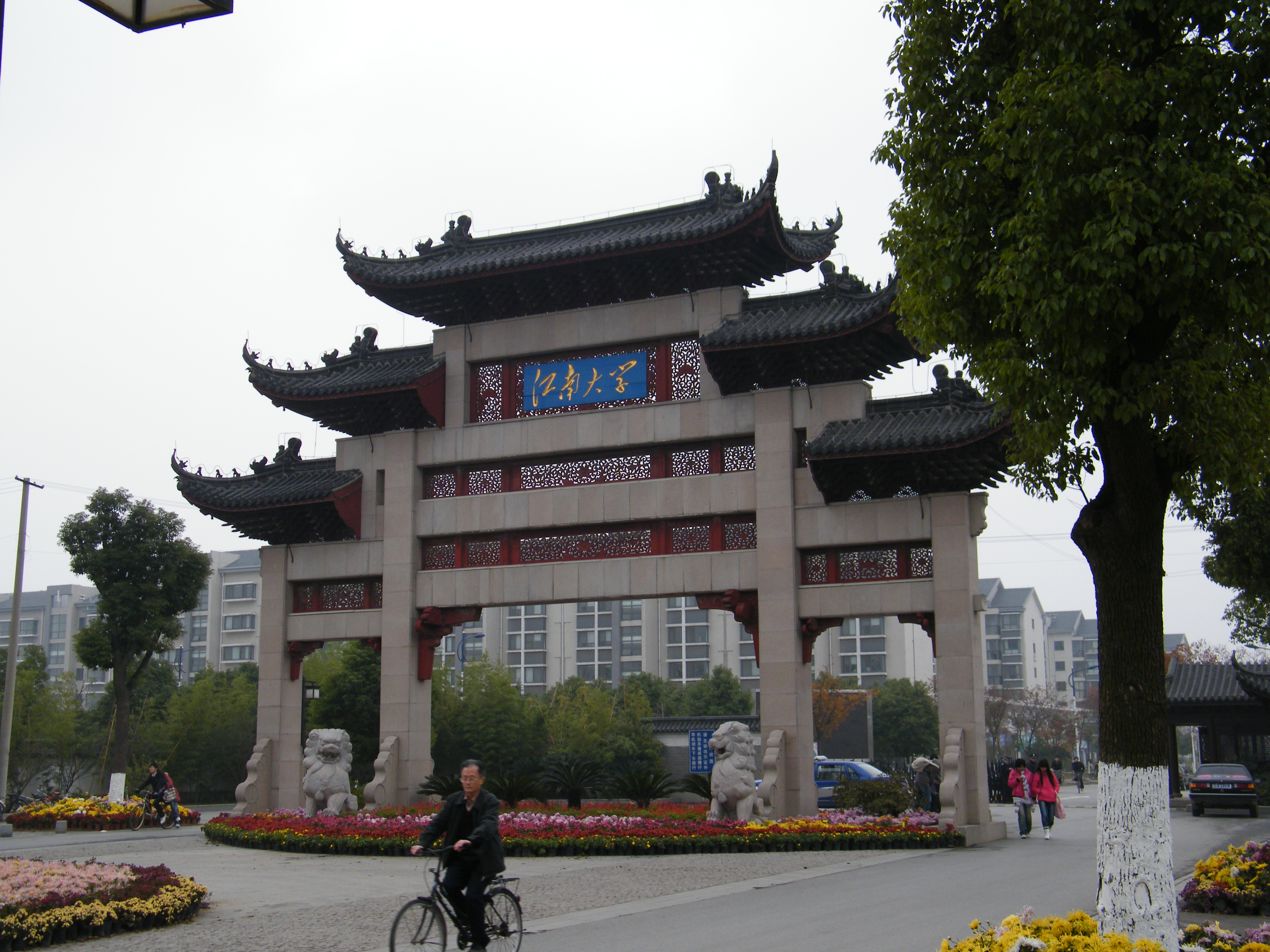
- Jiangnan University
  Jiangnan University: a key national university of "Project 211" and center for scientific research, which was originally founded in 1902 and established in 1958 as the Wuxi Institute of Light Industry. In 2001 it was reconstituted by the Ministry of Education with the merger of two other colleges to formally establish Jiangnan University. The Taihu University of Wuxi, beside Huishan National Forest Park is a private university and one of the largest in China, covering over 2,000 acres with over 20,000 teachers and students and more than 20 different faculties.
- Wuxi University: Wuxi University, located in Wuxi City, Jiangsu Province, is a public general undergraduate university approved by the Ministry of Education, managed by the People's Government of Jiangsu Province, organized by the People's Government of Wuxi City, and supported by Nanjing University of Information Science and Technology.
- DongNan University Wuxi Campus: Founded in April 1988, formerly known as Southeast University Wuxi Campus, it is one of the first batch of key university branches approved by the former State Education Commission, and it is the first to explore the cultivation mode of outstanding engineers in my country.
- Wuxi Institute of Technology
- Nanjing University of Posts and Telecommunications Wuxi Campus
- Nanjing University of Science and Technology Jiangyin Campus
- Wuxi Higher Normal School: Founded in 1911, it was formerly known as the Jiangsu Provincial Third Normal School. Famous scholars such as Qian Songyan, Wu Guanzhong, and Chen Shouzhu are all alumni of the school.
- Peking University School of Software and Microelectronics: Established in March 2002, it is a school directly affiliated to Peking University.
- In addition, there are scientific research bases in Wuxi such as the Supercomputing Center, 702 Research Institute, and Microelectronics Research Institute, as well as Wuxi Research Institute of Nanjing University of Information Science and Technology, Wuxi Research Institute of Fudan University, Wuxi Research Institute of Huazhong University of Science and Technology, and Wuxi Research Institute of Huazhong University of Science and Technology. and many other university research institutes.
- In terms of junior college education, Wuxi has Wuxi Vocational and Technical College, Wuxi Nanyang Vocational and Technical College, Jiangsu Information Vocational and Technical College, Wuxi Science and Technology Vocational College, Wuxi Business Vocational and Technical College, Wuxi Technology Vocational and Technical College, Wuxi City Vocational and Technical College, etc. A junior college with a good employment rate. Wuxi Vocational and Technical College is about to be upgraded to an undergraduate college.

== Medical ==
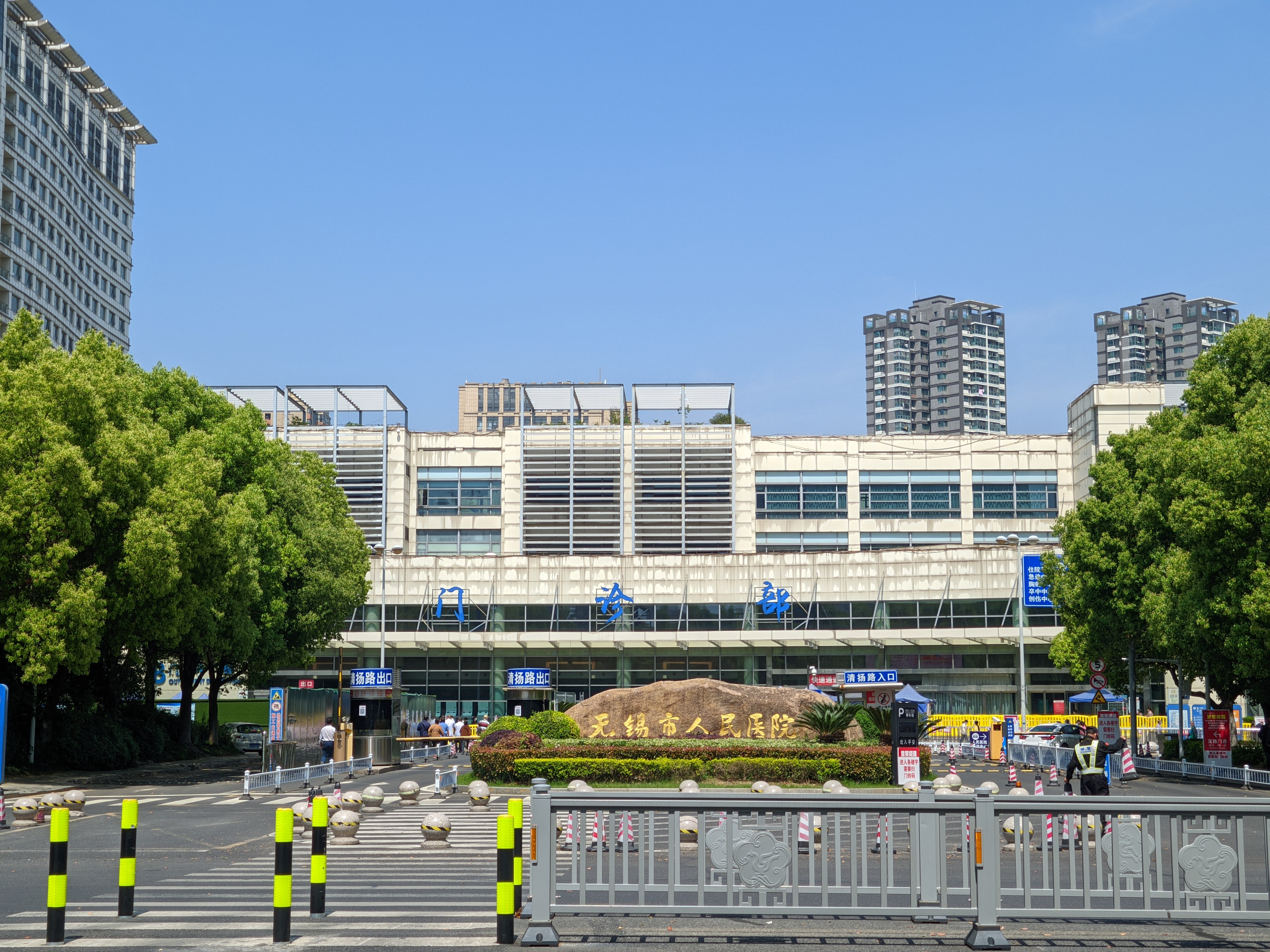
Wuxi No. 1 People's Hospital

Wuxi has a long history of medicine, especially in the Ming and Qing Dynasties. Since the Ming Dynasty, famous doctors such as You Zhongren, Shi Zhongmo, Deng Xingbo, Ke Huaizu, Xue Fuchen, etc. have either worked in the imperial hospital, or been ordered to diagnose and treat the royal family. Among them, Tan Yunxian and Xu Lushi are rare female doctors in ancient China. As for the modern medical institutions in Wuxi, it began in 1908 when Li Kele, a missionary of the American Episcopal Church and a doctor of medicine, founded the Puren Hospital, which is now the Second People's Hospital of Wuxi.

At present, Wuxi has one medical school (Medical College Affiliated to Jiangnan University), ten municipal hospitals, and 210 hospitals, including fourteen tertiary hospitals

- Wuxi No. 1 People's Hospital
- Wuxi No. 2 People's Hospital (North and South Campus)
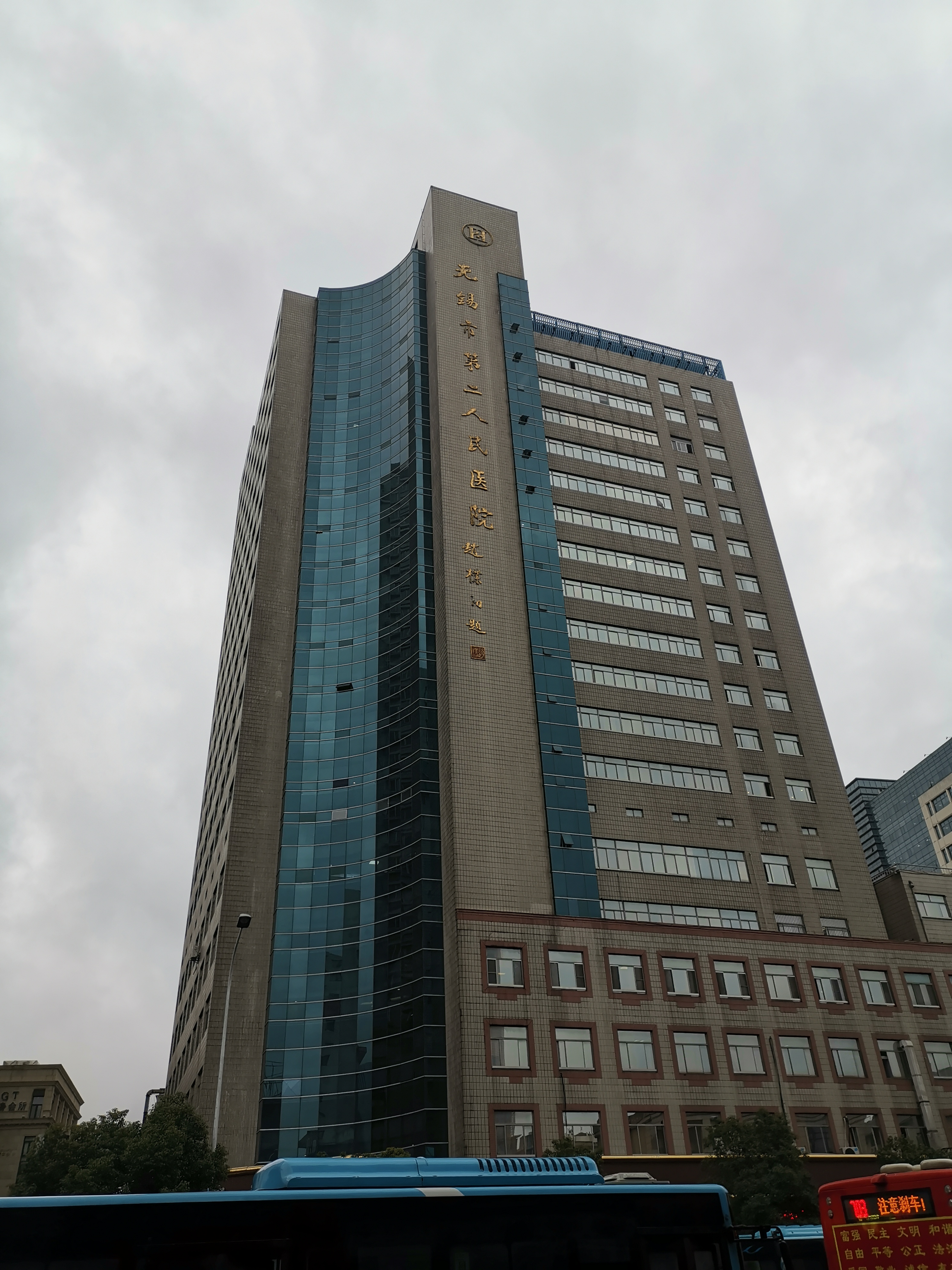
  Wuxi No. 2 People's Hospital
- Jiangnan University Affiliated Hospital (formerly No. 3 Hospital and No. 4 Hospital, currently North and South Branches)
- Wuxi No. 5 People's Hospital
- Wuxi No. 7 People's Hospital, Wuxi Ninth People's Hospital
- Wuxi Traditional Chinese Medicine Hospital
- Wuxi Maternal and Child Health Center
- Wuxi Children's Hospital
- 904 General Hospital
- Jiangyin People's Hospital
- Jiangyin Hospital of Traditional Chinese Medicine
- Yixing People's Hospital
- Yixing Hospital of Traditional Chinese Medicine

among which Wuxi People's Hospital released the "2013 China Ranked" twelfth in the "Top 100 Competitiveness List of Prefectural-level City Hospitals".

== Sports ==
The Wuxi Sports Center opened in October 1994 and has a capacity of 30,000. It hosts the Wuxi Classic, a snooker event which attracted the biggest names in snooker. Wuxi City Sports Park Stadium hosted the 2017 ITTF Asian-Championships (Ping Pong), and the 2019 World Cup in snooker in June 2019. Major League Baseball based its main Chinese recruitment center in Wuxi since 2009 in Wuxi Development Center at Dongbeitang High School. There Major League Baseball scouts recruit the best players in China in the hopes that they will eventually play professional baseball in America.

Due to the aging of the Wuxi New Sports Center and other reasons, the Wuxi Olympic Sports Center project will officially open in 2026. The facility covers approximately 56.7 hectares, with a total construction area of approximately 467,000 square meters and a total investment of approximately 6.9 billion yuan. It is planned to include a 60,000-seat stadium, an 18,000-seat gymnasium, a 2,000-seat swimming pool, and a public fitness center, and will be built to Class A stadium standards, capable of hosting large-scale national comprehensive sports events. In addition to the stadium and gymnasium, a 70,000-square-meter cultural, commercial, sports, and tourism complex, including commercial areas and hotels, will also be constructed.

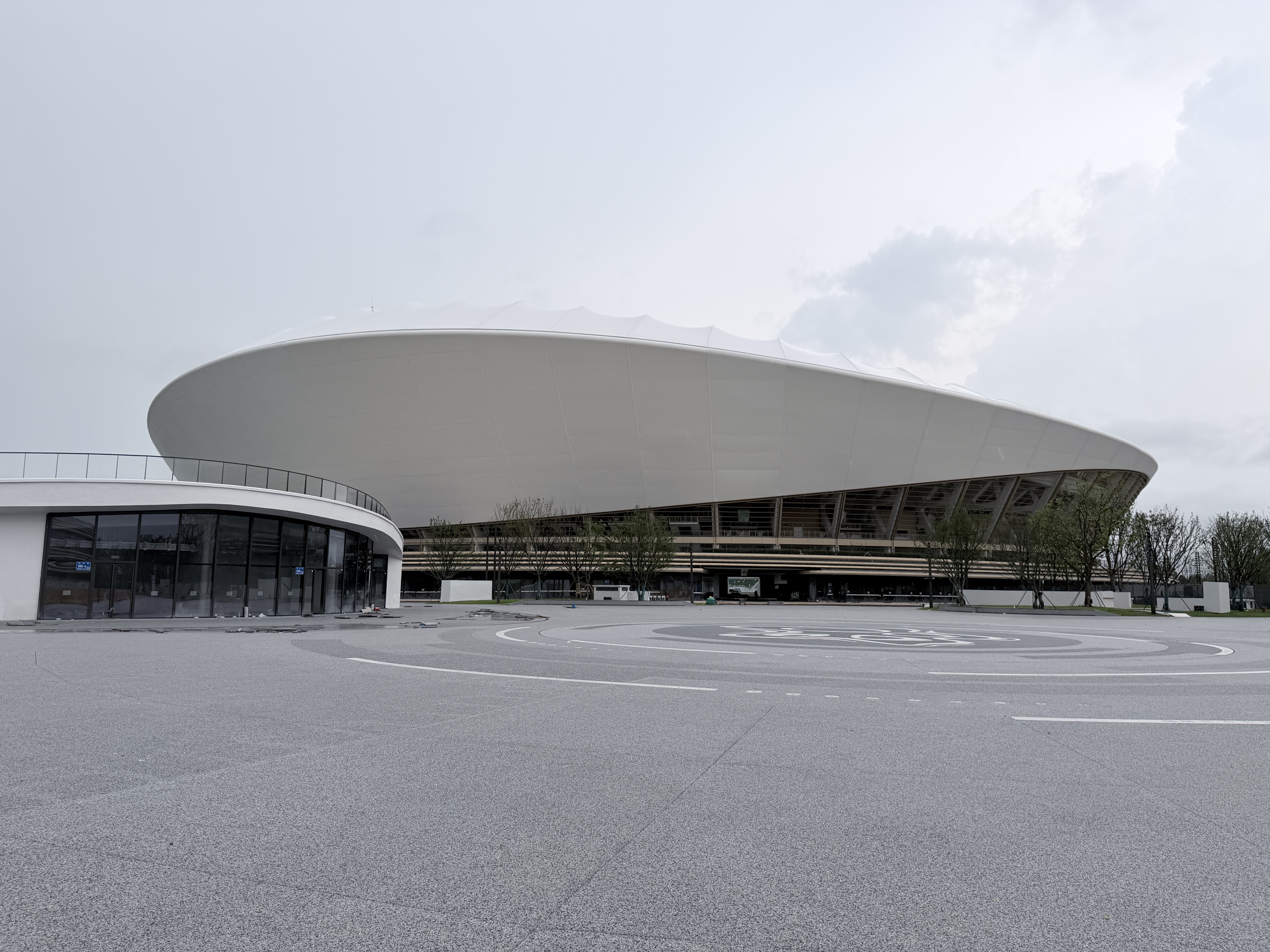
Wuxi Olympic Sports Center

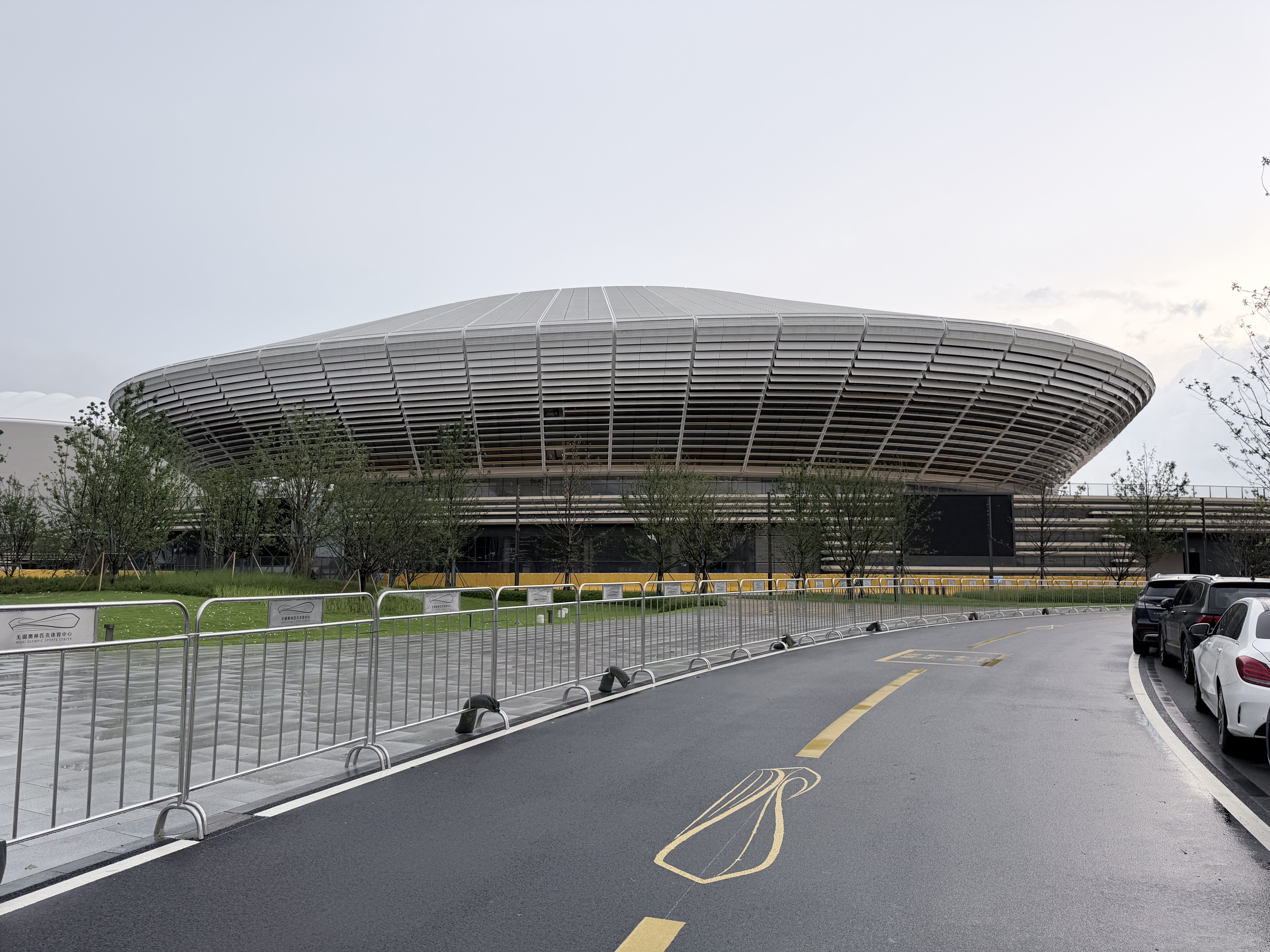
Wuxi Olympic Sports Center Swimming Pool

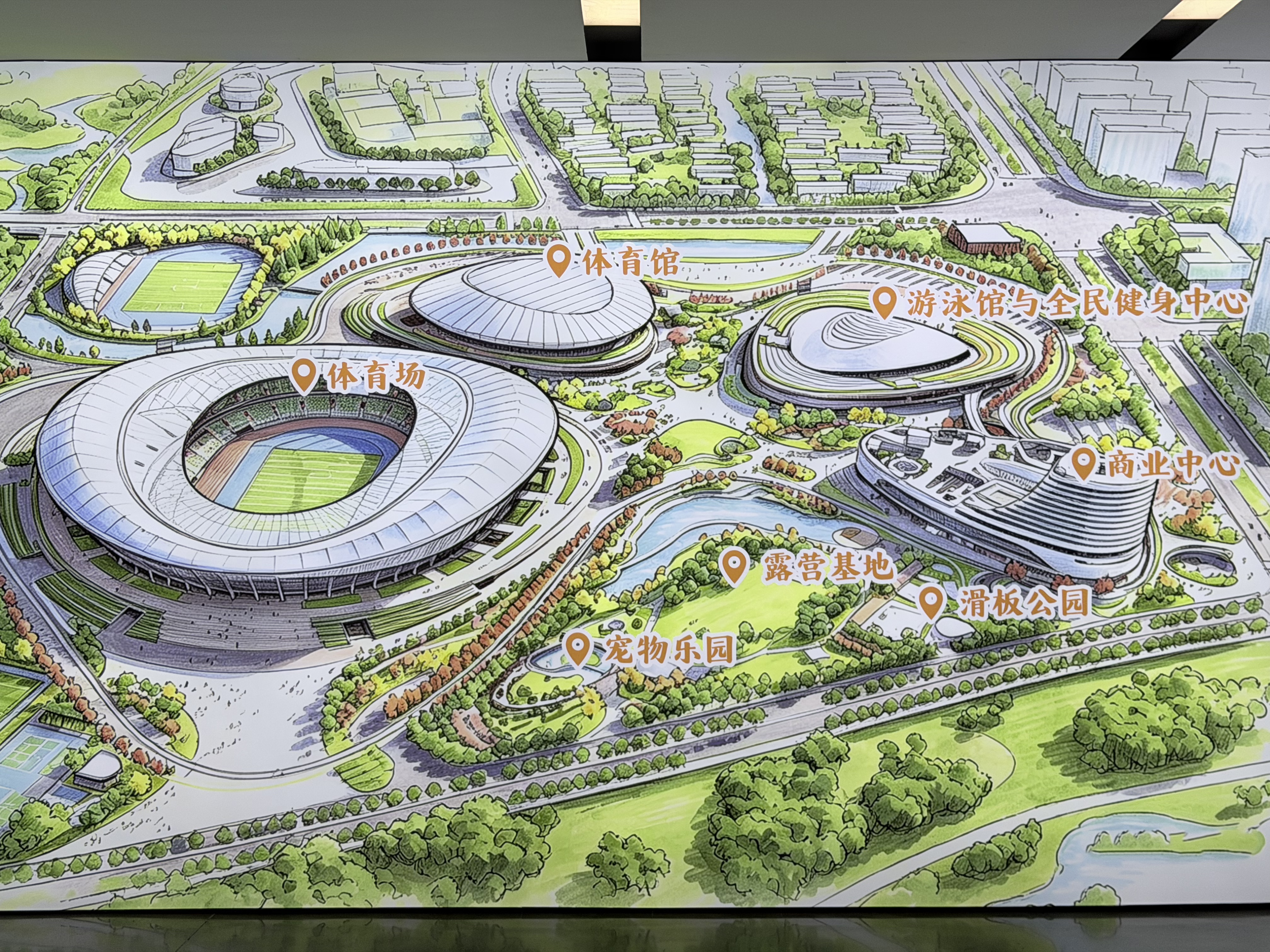
Wuxi Olympic Sports Center Guide Map

== Landmarks ==
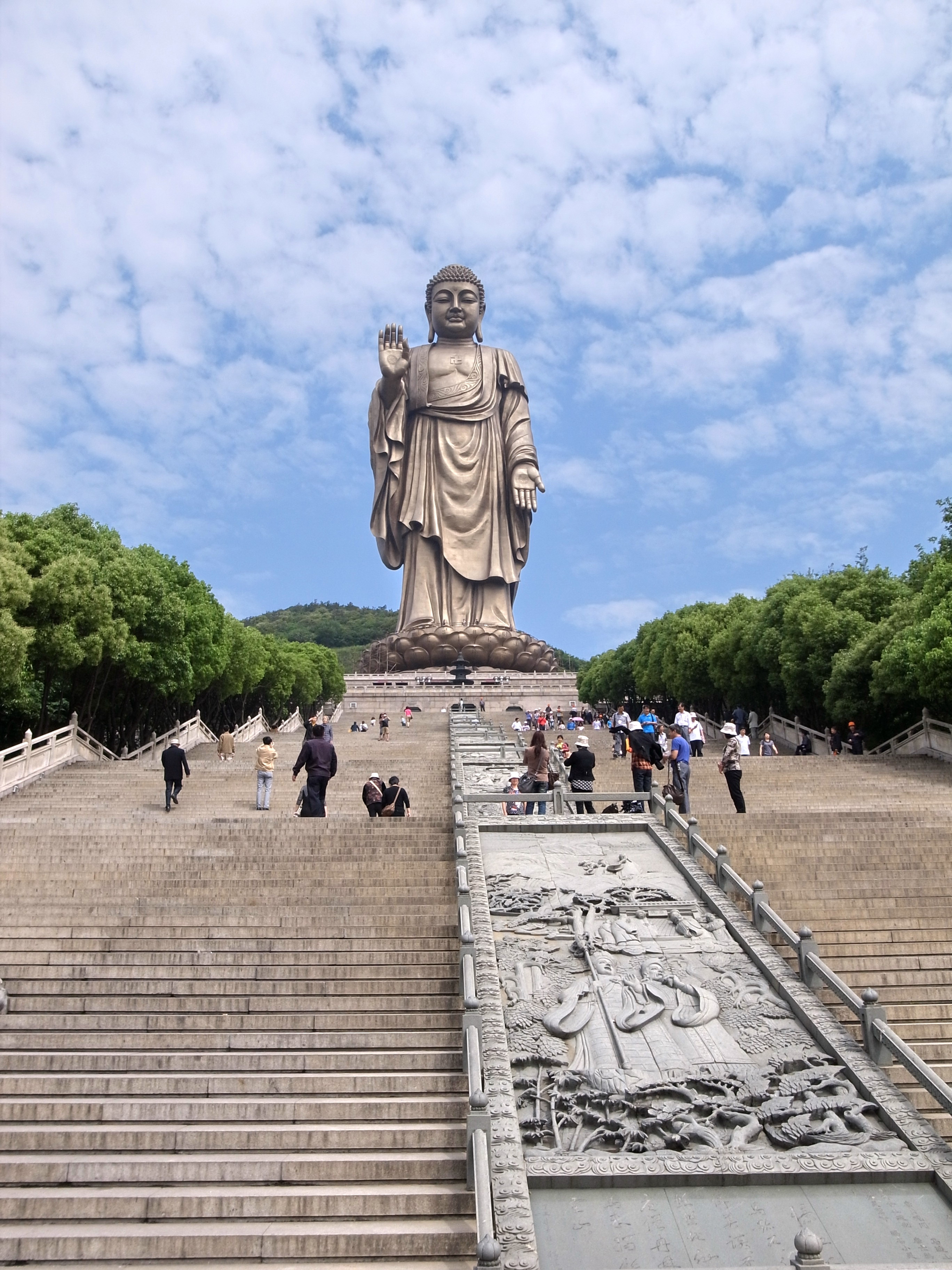
Grand Buddha at Ling Shan

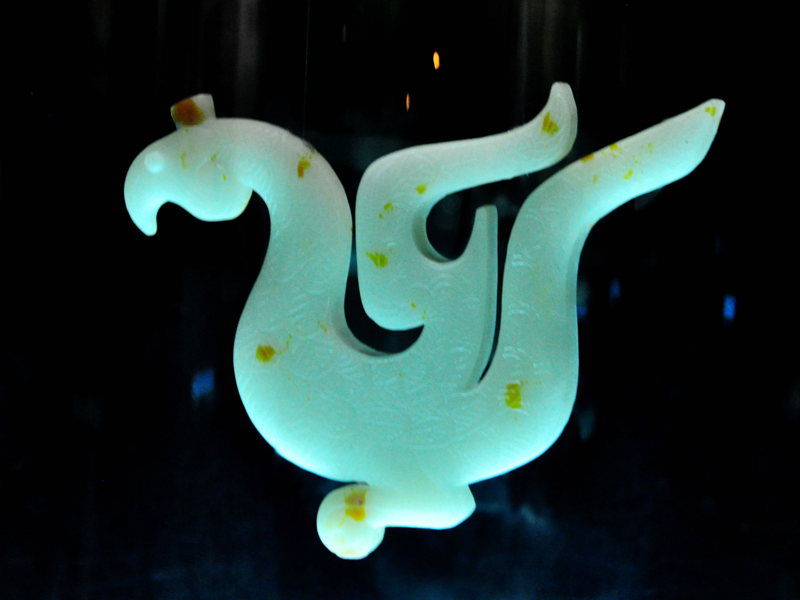
Jade Phoenix Source of Wuxi City Emblem

The city lies in the southern Yangtze River delta on Lake Tai, which is the third largest freshwater lake in China, and a rich resource for tourism in the area with cruises. There are 72 peninsulas and peaks and 48 islets, including Yuantouzhu (the Islet of Turtlehead) and Taihu Xiandao (Islands of the Deities).

=== Parks and gardens ===
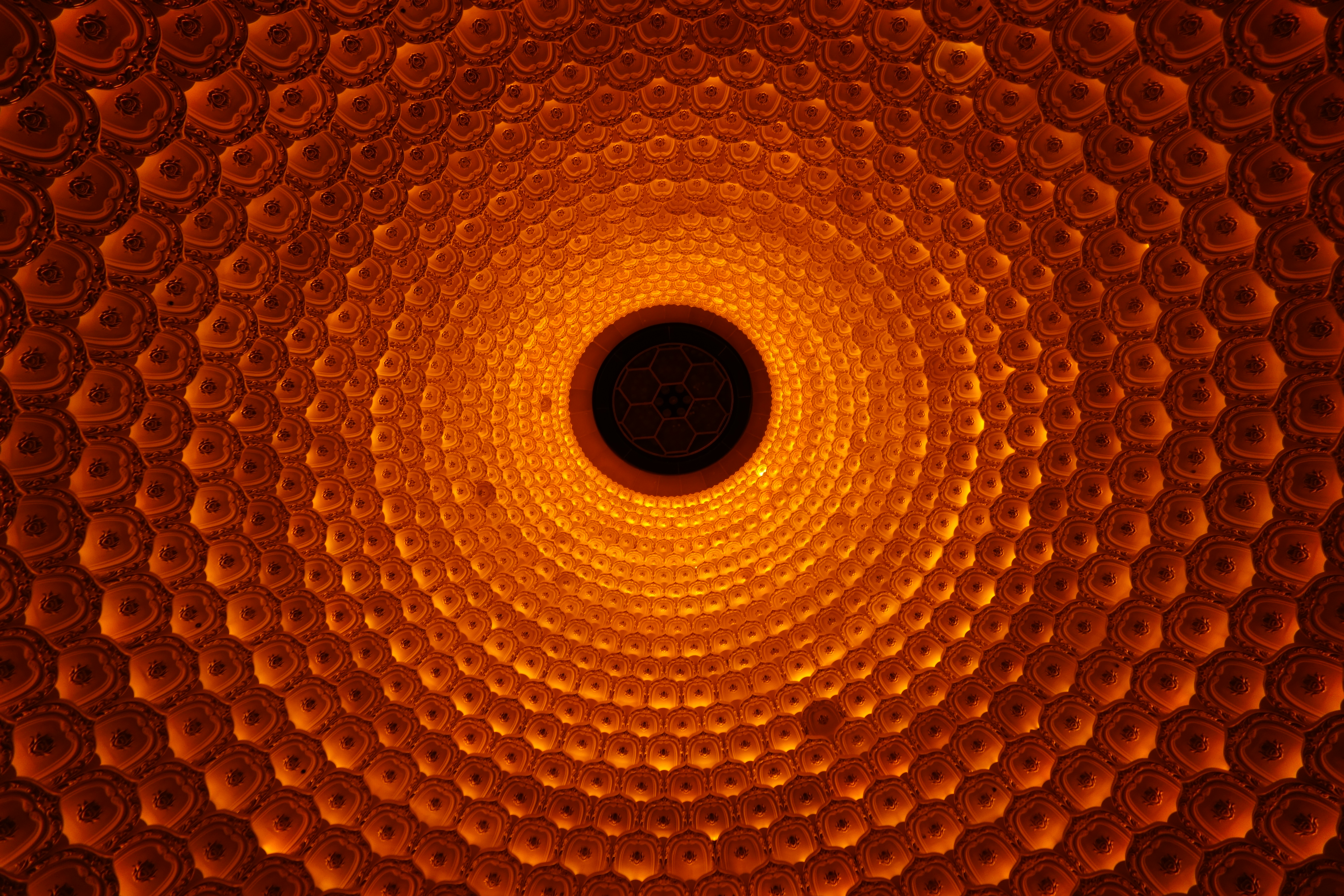
The dome made of lights of the Holy Altar in the Brahma Palace, near the Grand Buddha at Ling Shan

Wuxi has many private gardens or parks built by learned scholars and illustrious people in the past. Lihu Park in Binhu District was built in 1927 and named after the politician and economist Fan Li. The Star of Taihu Lake is noted for its water Ferris wheel. The gardens contains a long embankment with willow trees and a path beside the lake with numerous small bridges and pavilions. On the southwest bank of the lake at the foot of Junzhang Hill is Changguangxi Wetland Park, a 10 kilometers (6.2 mi) stretch of canal connecting Lihu Lake to the north and Taihu Lake to the south. It contains the Shitang Bridge and a lotus pond. Also in Binhu District is Wuxi Zoo and Taihu Lake Amusement Park, an AAAA national landmark with over 1000 animals including Asian elephant, leopard, chimpanzee, giant panda and white rhinoceros and an ecology and science exhibition and recreation area.

The 30 hectare (74 acres) Mt. Lingshan Grand Buddha Scenic Area on the southwest tip of Wuxi contains the 88 meters (289 ft) tall Grand Buddha at Ling Shan, the world's largest bronze Buddha statue. The Mt Lingshan area also contains the Brahma Palace, Xiangfu Temple, Five Mudra Mandala, Nine Dragons Bathing Sakyamuni (a 7.2 meters (24 ft) statue of Sakyamuni), and numerous other Buddhist sites. Xihui Park, established in 1958 at the foot of Xi Shan to the west of the city, contains Jichang Garden and the Dragon Light Pagoda.

=== Museums ===
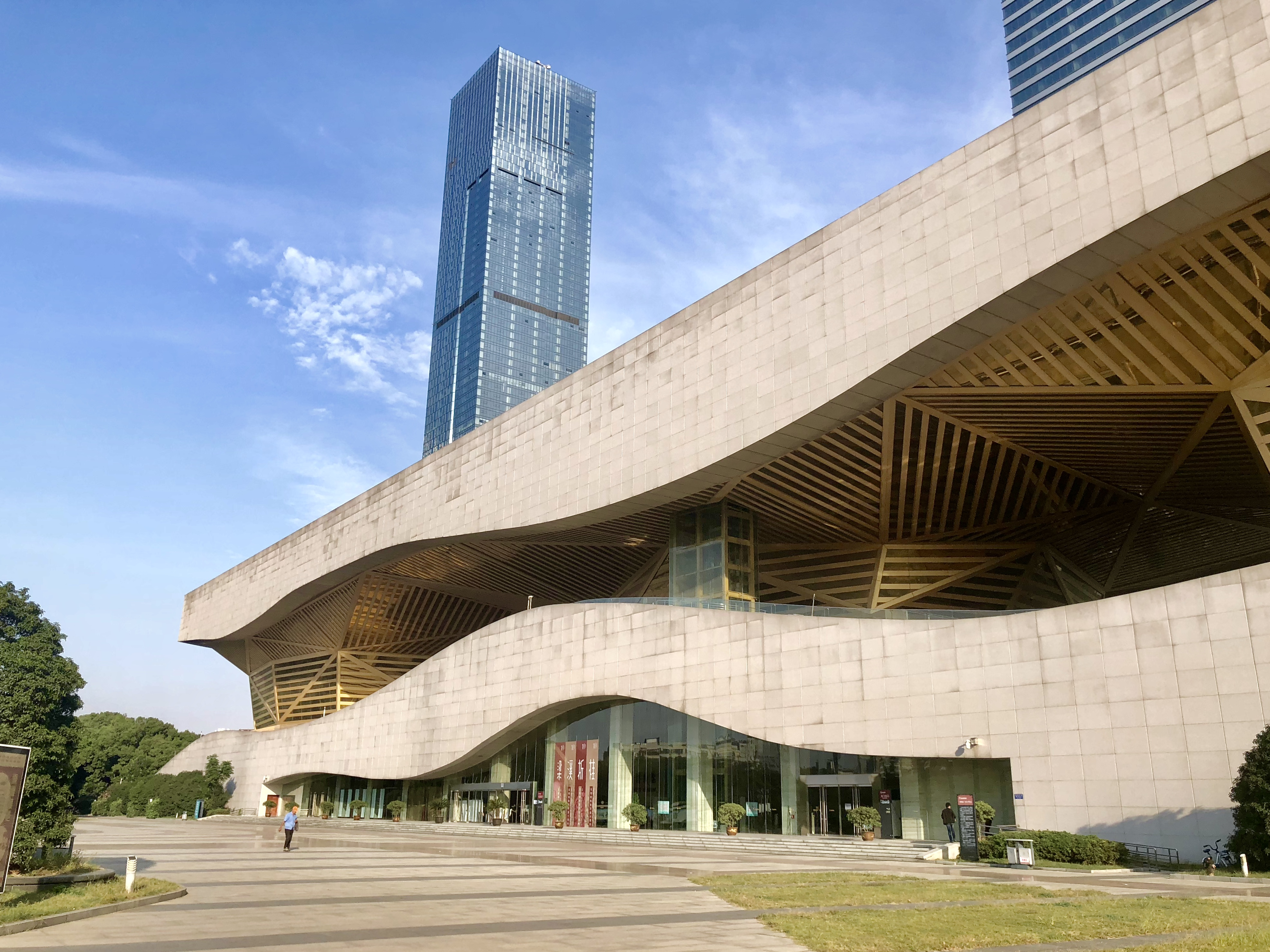
Wuxi Museum

Wuxi Museum was formally opened on 1 October 2008 following a merger of the Wuxi Revolution Museum, Wuxi Museum and Wuxi Science Museum. Covering over 71,000 square meters (760,000 sq ft) and an exhibition area of 24,100 square meters (259,000 sq ft) it is the largest public cultural building in Wuxi, with 600,000 visitors annually as of 2019. The museum also administers the Chinese National Industry and Commerce Museum of Wuxi, Chengji Art Museum, Zhou Huaimin Painting Museum, Zhang Wentian Former Residence and Wuxi Ancient Stone Inscriptions Museum. Wuxi Art Museum, known as the Wuxi Painting and Calligraphy Institute before the rename in 2011, was established on 7 December 1979 in Chong'an district. The current facility has a space of 1,135 meters (3,724 ft).

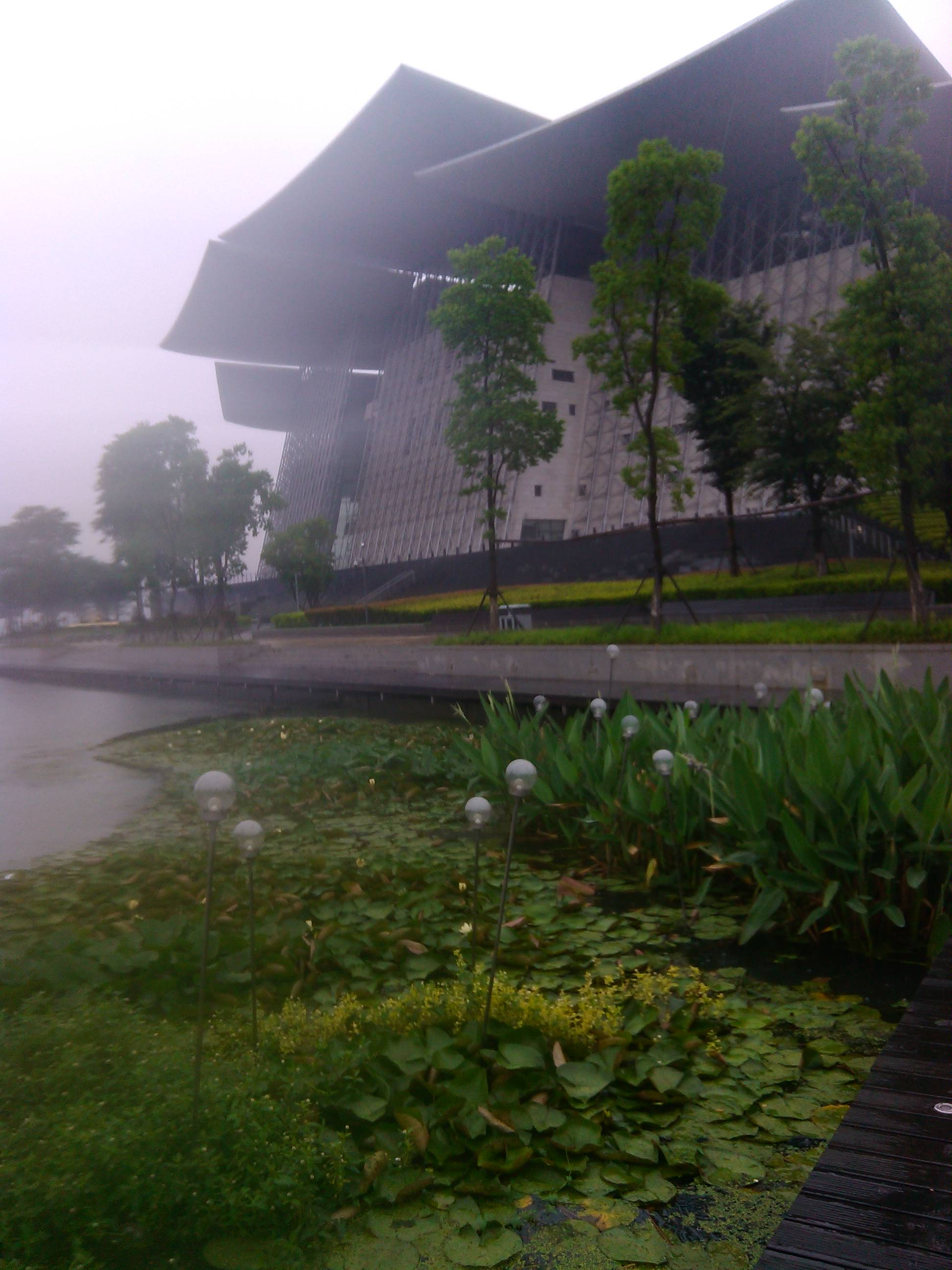
Wuxi Grand Theater

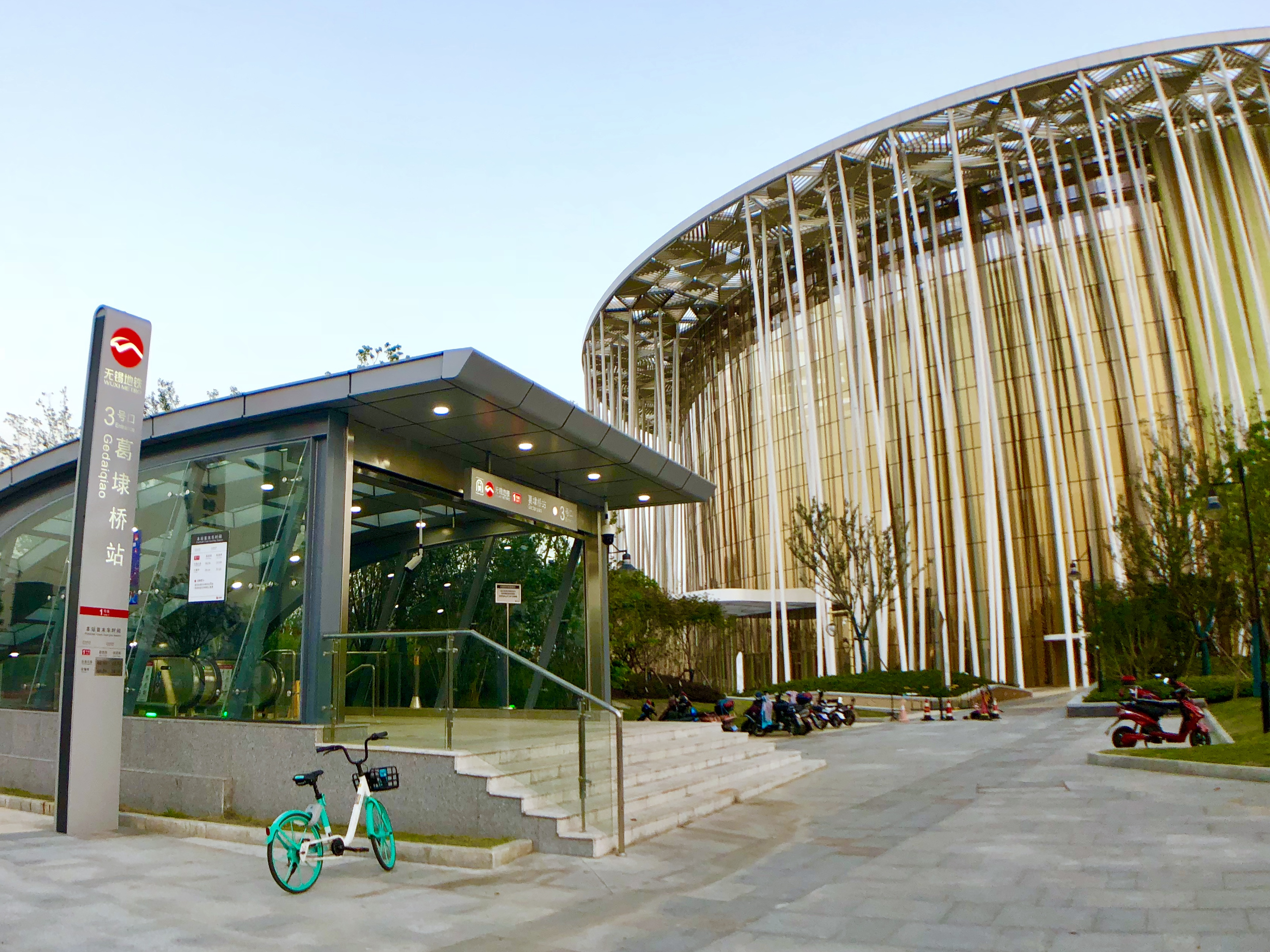
Wuxi Sunac Taihu Show Project

Hongshan Archaeological Museum in Wuxi New District opened in 2008 and houses artifacts related to the local Wu culture between 770 and 221 BC. The items, which include miniature jade engravings and objects related to burial and musical customs, were unearthed at Hongshan Tomb Complex in 2004.

The Helv City Ruins is an extremely precious historical and cultural heritage in Wuxi City, and it is the capital of Helu, one of the Five Hegemons in the Spring and Autumn Period. The city was built in the first year of Helu (the sixth year of King Jing of Zhou, 514 BC), more than 2,500 years ago.

As early as 1956, the Helu City site was named a provincial cultural relic protection unit by the Jiangsu Provincial Government. At the national expert demonstration meeting held in 2008, the site was identified as the capital of King Helu of Wu, and was named one of the "Top Ten New Archaeological Discoveries in China in 2008". In 2011, it was selected as a "Jiangsu Grand Site". In March 2013, it was named the seventh batch of national key cultural relics protection units by the State Council. In December of the same year, it was selected into the National Archaeological Site Park Project List announced by the State Administration of Cultural Heritage.

The Former Residence of Xue Fucheng at No. 152 Xueqian Street in Chong'an district, is the former home of Zue Fencheng, a noted diplomat of the late Qing dynasty and is open to the public.

In addition, Wuxi also has the famous Wuxi Grand Theater and Sunac Taihu Show. In December 2023, the Wuxi International Convention Center opened; in 2026, the Wuxi Concert Hall and Art Museum also began to provide cultural services to residents.

Wuxi Concert Hall

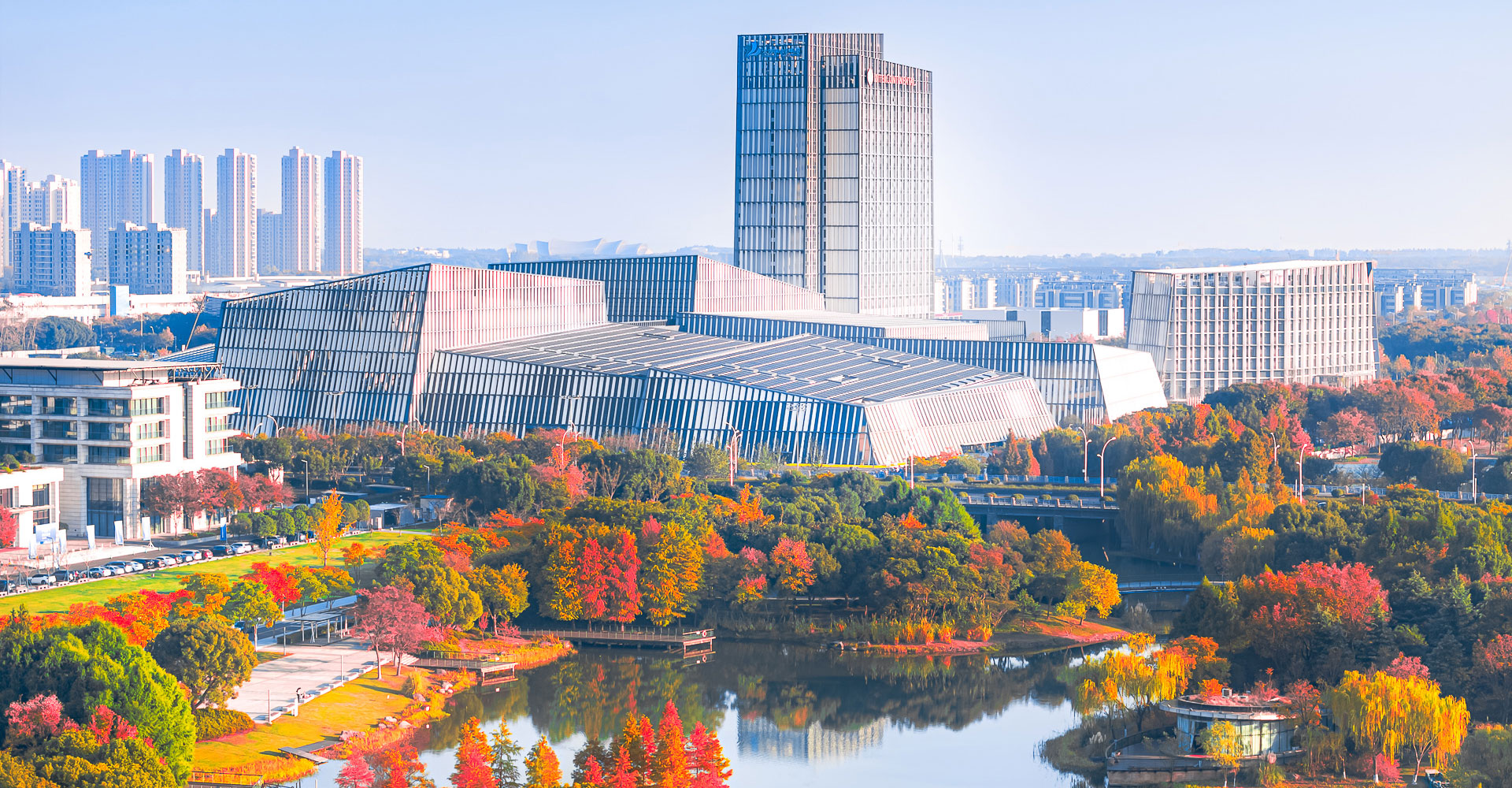
Wuxi Conference Center

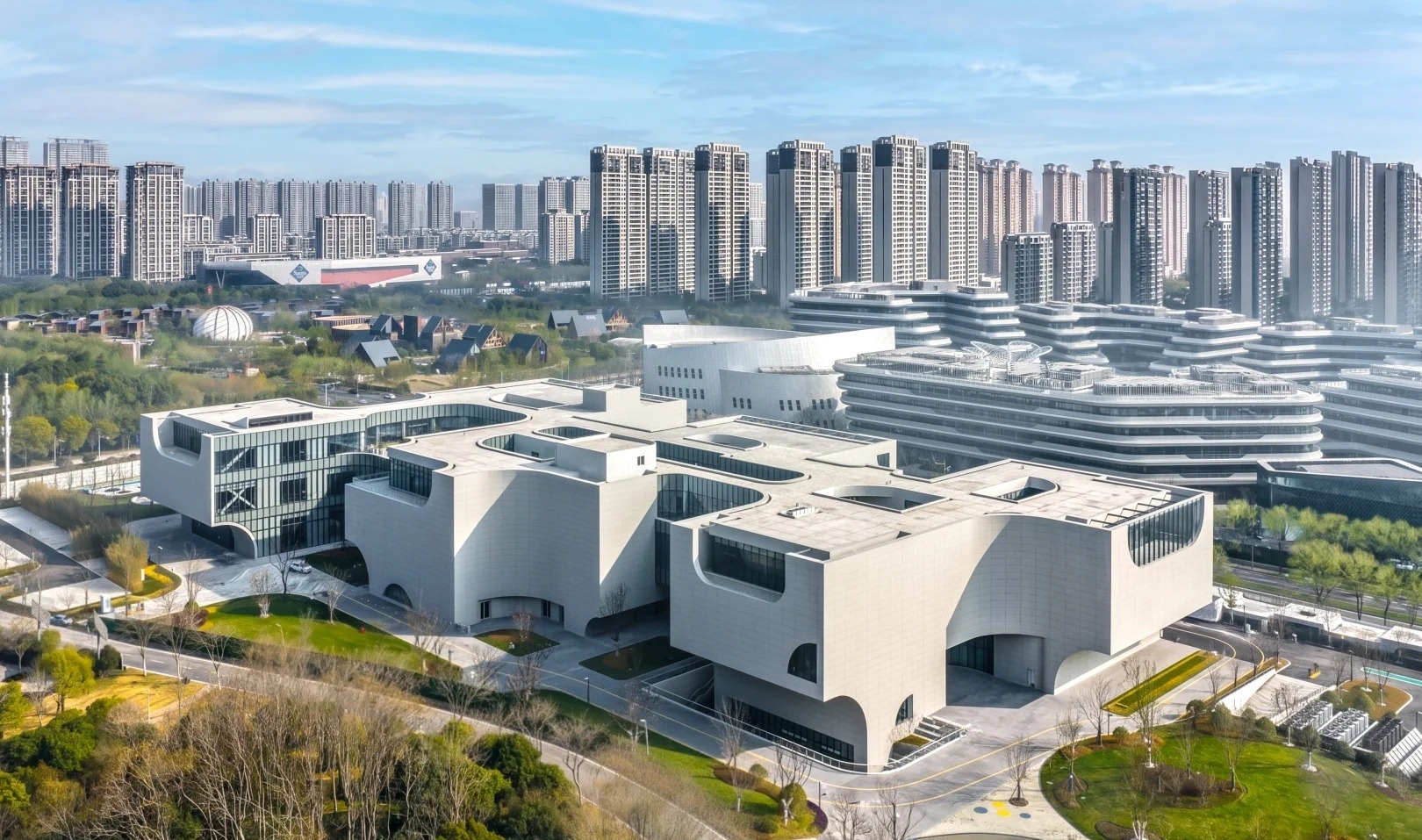
Wuxi Art Museum

== Notable people ==
- An Guo, printer and collector of antiques (1481–1534)
- Ni Zan, painter (1301–1374)
- Xue Fucheng, diplomat (1838–1894)
- Gu Deng, mathematician and politician (1882–1947?)
- Chen Chi (1912–2005), painter
- Hua Yanjun (1893–1950), musician
- Liu Tianhua, folk musician (1895–1932)
- Yang Ling-fu, artist (1889–1978)
- Zhou Peiyuan (1902–1993), theoretical physicist
- Zhang Xu, telecommunications engineer (1913–2015)
- Zhou Yongkang (b. 1942), politician
- Zou Jiayi (b. 1963), politician and economist
- Qian Zhongshu, 20th century Chinese literary scholar and writer (1910–1998)
- Qian Weichang, physicist, applied mathematician and academician of the Chinese Academy of Sciences (1910–1998)
- Marie Lu (b. 1984), novelist, author of Legend series
- Feng Jialiang (born 1966), artist
- Zhang Linghe (born 1997), actor

== Sister cities ==
=== Asia ===
- Akashi, Hyogo, Japan: since 29 August 1981
- Sagamihara City, Japan: since 6 October 1985
- Gimhae, South Korea: since 24 October 2006
- Puerto Princesa City, Philippines: since 30 October 2007
- Sihanoukville, Cambodia: since 29 July 2009
- Ulsan, South Korea: since 20 January 2014
- Tiberias, Israel: since 22 July 2015

=== Europe ===
- Cascais, Portugal: since 14 September 1993
- Vicenza, Italy: since 25 January 2006
- Leverkusen, Germany: since 27 April 2006
- Bocholt, Germany: since October, 2003
- Nimes, France: since 5 April 2007
- Södertälje, Sweden: since 8 October 2007
- Kortrijk, Belgium: since 30 October 2007
- Bycirklen, Denmark: since 22 August 2008
- Chelmsford, United Kingdom: since 19 November 2009
- 's-Hertogenbosch, The Netherlands: since 10 February 2010
- Lahti, Finland: since 7 November 2011
- Patras, Greece: since 24 December 2012
- Zielona Góra, Poland: since 7 January 2014

=== America ===
- Chattanooga, United States: since 12 October 1982
- Fredericton, Canada: since 22 November 2010
- Sorocaba, Brazil: since 18 December 2010
- San Antonio, United States: since 16 February 2012
- Puebla, Mexico: since 25 December 2014

=== Oceania ===
- Hamilton, New Zealand: since 5 July 1986
- Frankston, Australia: since 8 November 2012

=== Africa ===
- Fez, Morocco: since 29 June 2010

== See also ==
- List of cities in the People's Republic of China by population
- List of twin towns and sister cities in China
