= Jetion Holdings =

Chinese photovoltaics company

Jetion Holdings Limited (Chinese: 中建材浚鑫科技有限公司; AIM: JHL) is a designer, manufacturer and supplier of solar cells and modules. The holdings holds the factory Jiangyin Jetion Science and Technology Co Ltd which is located at Jiangyin (a county-level city of Wuxi), Jiangsu, China. During the year ended 2007, the company had a cell manufacturing capacity of 50 megawatts, and a module capacity of 40 megawatts. The company's output of solar cells for 2007 was 35.2 megawatts. In October 2007, it established a European joint venture, Jetion Europe. In March 2008, Jetion announced that it had entered into an agreement with a Japanese company to purchase 100 megawatts of solar polycrystalline silicon feedstock with immediate effect through until 2011.

== History ==
Jetion listed on the Alternative Investment Market in 2007. The "Deloitte Technology Fast 500 Asia-Pacific", which identifies the most rapidly expanding businesses in the Asia–Pacific, listed Jetion as number two in 2008. Robert Linsday of The Times in 2008 attributed Jetion's stock market "slump" to "a perception that it has not communicated well enough with the market". Spain is a significant market for the company.

In 2009, Jetion fired its CEO and three members of its leadership team, citing "breaches of their service contracts and fiduciary duties". Comparing Jetion to Bodisen Biotech, the Nomura Securities analyst John-Marc Bunce stated that this action was "likely to have a sentimental knock-on effect on other foreign-listed Chinese companies".

== Finance ==
For the six months ended 30 June 2008, Jetion Holdings Limited's revenues totaled $100.7M, up from $38.6M. Net income totaled $9.7M, up from $2.8M. Revenues reflect an increase in income from cells and modules segment. Net income reflects the presence of other income, lower research & development expenses, increased finance income and the presence of share of profits less losses of joint controlled entity.
