= Lihu Park =

Park in Wuxi, China

Lihu Park is a park located in Binhu District, Wuxi, Jiangsu, China. It covers an area of 300 acres and it is free to the public. In the late Ming Dynasty, some scholars said that Fan Li and Xi Shi boated here. So, it becomes more popular because of this legend. There is a very big Ferris Wheel in the park which you can see the time you get into the park. There are also other interesting spots in it, such as carousel, maze and The Arctic World. There are many sculptures in it which are featured in the cold world. When you get into it, the guards will give you some thick clothes because it is very cold in it but there many beautiful things in it. The park also has many old buildings behind trees which make them look very mysterious and attractive. It is next to TaiHu, so you can just go there by boating.
