= Taihu =

Large freshwater lake in Jiangsu, China

Lake Tai
- Taihu, T'ai-hu
- 太湖 (Chinese)
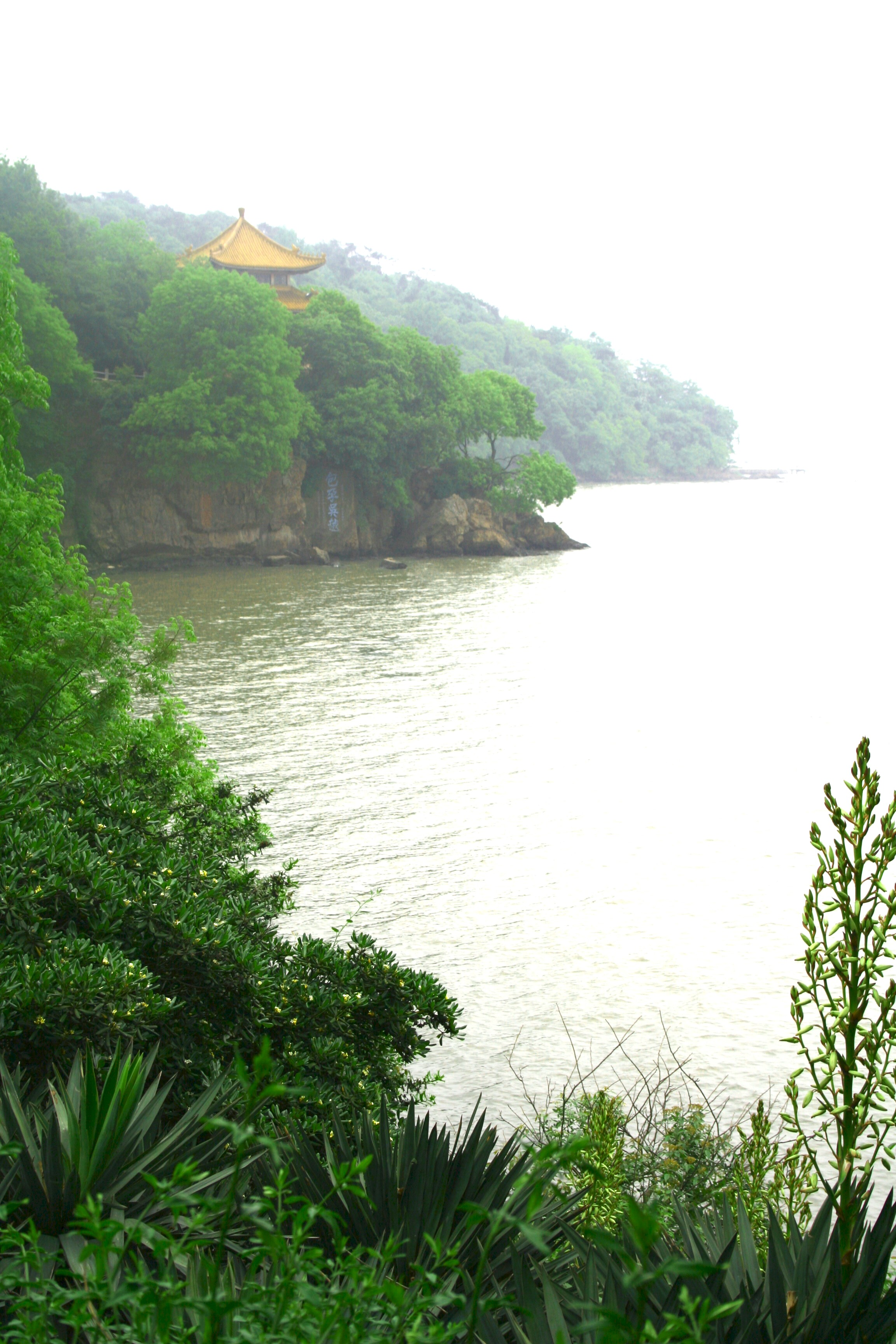
- Lake scenery at Wuxi

- Location in Jiangsu Location in Zhejiang Lake Tai (Eastern China)
- Location: southern Jiangsu and northern Zhejiang
- Coordinates: 31°14′N 120°8′E
- Basin countries: China
- Surface area: 2,250 km^{2} (869 sq mi)
- Average depth: 2 m (6.6 ft)
- Islands: 90
- Settlements: Huzhou, Suzhou, Wuxi

Taihu
- Chinese: 太湖
- Literal meaning: Great Lake
Transcriptions
Standard Mandarin
- Hanyu Pinyin: Tài Hú
Wu
- Romanization: Ta Wu

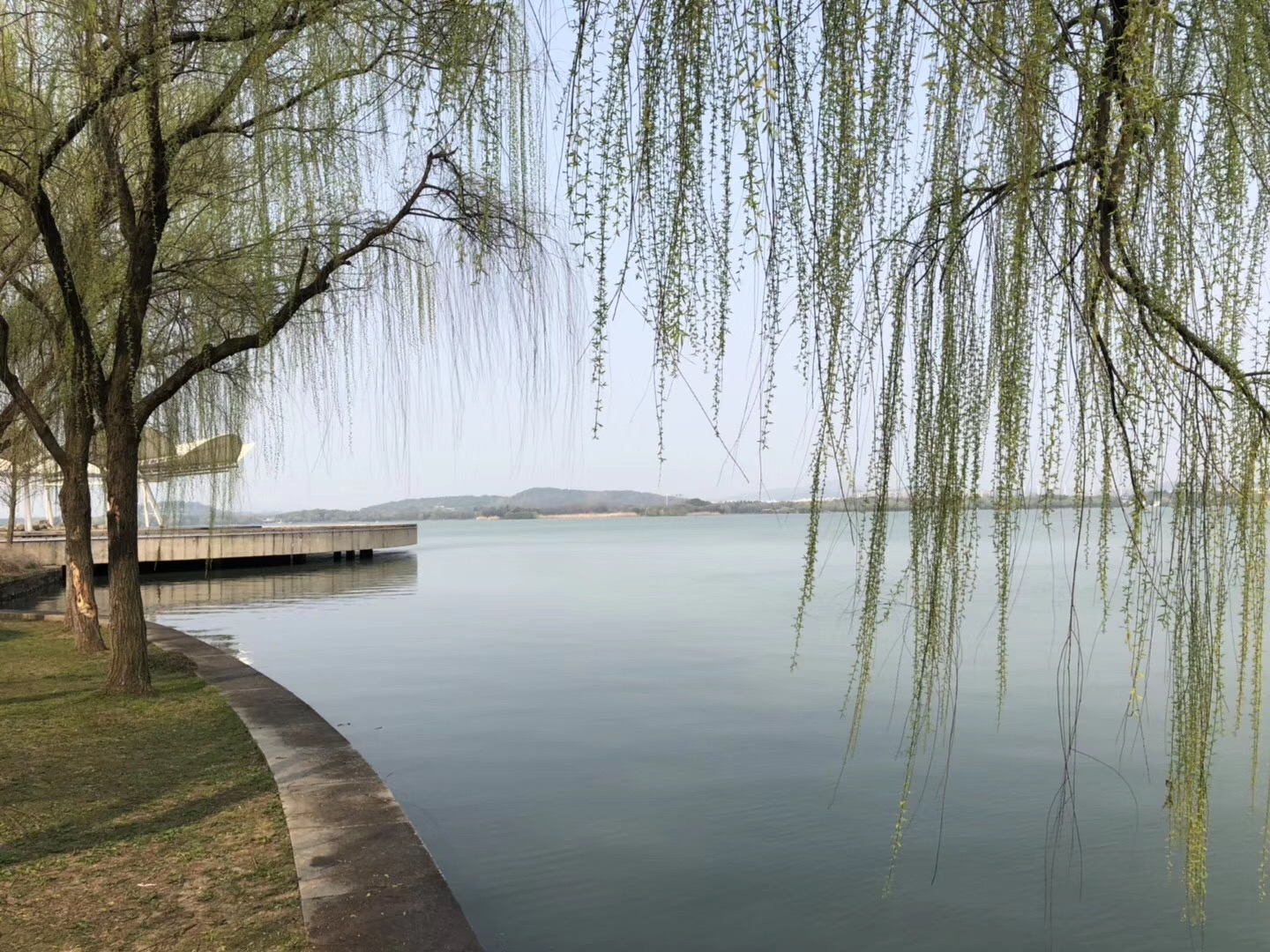
View from the water's edge

Taihu (Chinese: 太湖), also known as Lake Tai or Lake Taihu, is a lake in the Yangtze Delta and the third largest freshwater lake in China. The lake is in Jiangsu province and a significant part of its southern shore forms its border with Zhejiang. With an area of 2,250 square kilometers (869 sq mi) and an average depth of 2 meters (6.6 ft), it is the third-largest freshwater lake entirely in China, after Poyang and Dongting. (Note: Though encompassing a larger surface area than Poyang Lake, the majority of Lake Khanka (Xingkai) is in Russia's Primorsky Krai.) The lake contains about 90 islands, ranging in size from a few square meters to several square kilometers.

Lake Tai is linked to the Grand Canal and is the origin of a number of rivers, including the Suzhou Creek. The major cities around Taihu Lake include Suzhou, Wuxi, Changzhou and Huzhou. These urban areas form the core of the lake's cultural and economic region. University-led hydrological and ecological studies note that these four cities are the primary urban centers surrounding the lake.

Taihu Lake is officially designated as a national key scenic area under China's Major National Historical and Cultural Sites programme.

== Geography ==
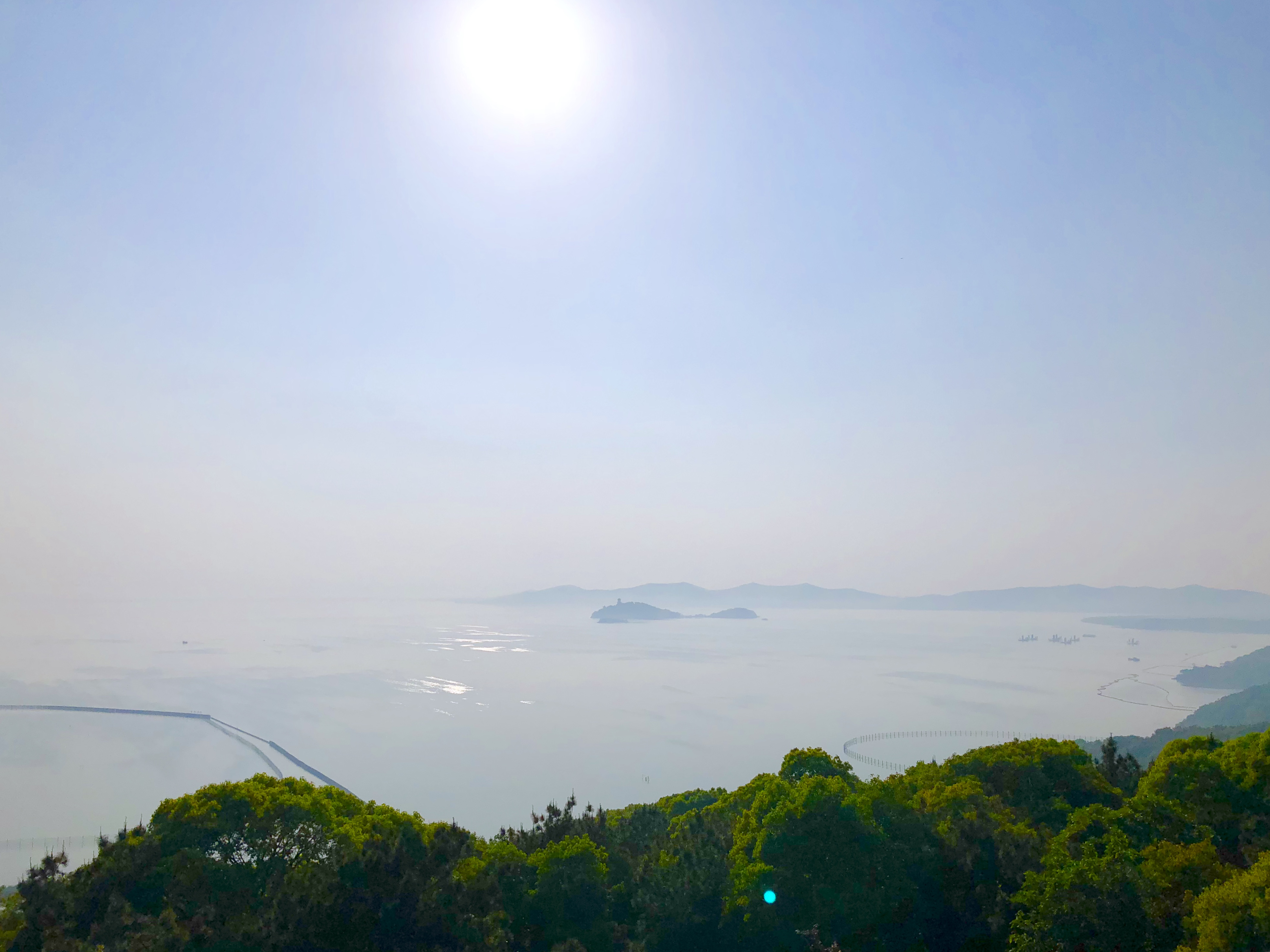
View of Taihu Lake from the top of Baojie Mountain, overlooking Sanshan Island in Wuxi

Taihu Lake features 48 islands and 72 surrounding peaks, forming a distinctive landscape of "mountains beyond mountains, lakes within lakes."

The area includes famous scenic locales such as Yuantouzhu, Sanshan (Three Hills), Dongshan, Xishan, and Majishan.

Bordering cities—Wuxi, the Classical Gardens of Suzhou, ancient sites of Wu culture, and the grottoes of Yixing—collectively form the internationally recognized Taihu Scenic Area.

Covering approximately 2,338 km^{2} in the Yangtze Delta, Taihu Lake lies between Jiangsu and Zhejiang. Its waters flow into the Yangtze River, and it is connected to the Beijing–Hangzhou Grand Canal.

At a normal Wusong elevation of 3.00 m, the lake averages 1.9 m and reaches a maximum of about 2.6 m in depth, holding roughly 4.66 × 10^{9} m^{3} of water. With an approximate inflow of 7.66 × 10^{9} m^{3} annually, its waters renew several times a year.

== Formation ==
Scientific studies suggest that Lake Tai's circular structure is the result of a meteor impact, which resulted in shatter cones, shock-metamorphosed quartz, microtektites, and shock-metamorphic unloading fractures. The prospective impact crater has been dated to be greater than 70 million years old and possibly from the late Devonian Period. Research in 2012 suggested that present evidence shows no impact crater structure or shock-mineral at Lake Tai. A more comprehensive study of soils in the lake in 2021 supported the hypothesis that the crater was instead formed by a meteor air burst high up, explaining the lake's shallowness. Fossils indicate that Lake Tai was dry land until the ingression of the East China Sea during the Holocene epoch. The growing deltas of the Yangtze and Qiantang rivers eventually sealed off Lake Tai from the sea, and the influx of fresh water from rivers and rains turned it into a freshwater lake.

== Scenic locations ==
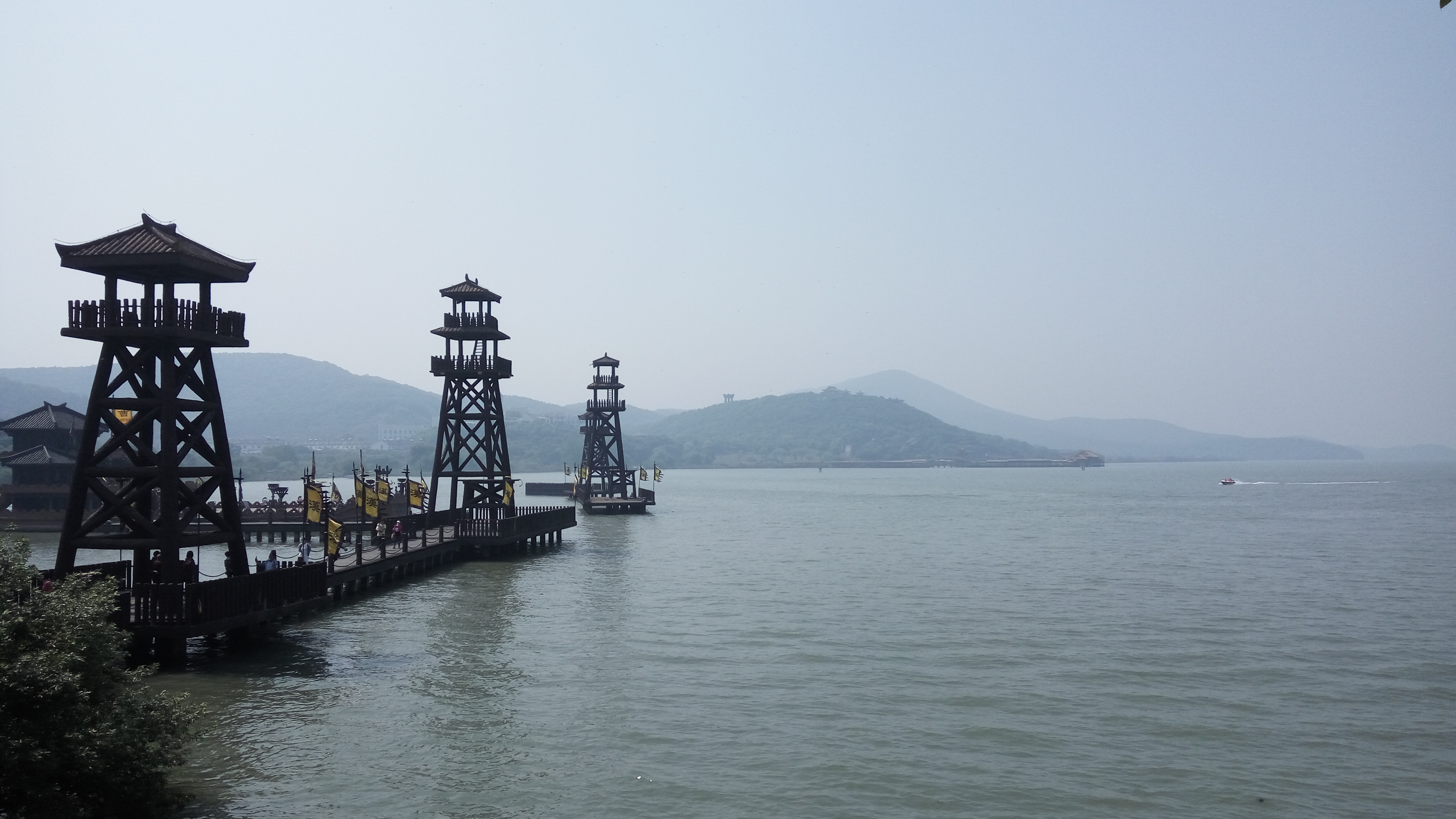
Shore of Lake Tai in Wuxi's Three Kingdoms Park

There are limestone formations at the foot of the adjacent Dongting Mountain (洞庭山). These "scholar's rocks" or "Taihu stones" are often prized as a decorating material for traditional Chinese gardens, as exemplified by those preserved in nearby Suzhou.

Three of the lake's islands are preserved as a national geological park under the name Sanshan. They are famed as a former haunt of local bandits. Mei Yuan is also located in Lake Tai, along with Yuantouzhu. Yuantouzhu received its name ("Turtle Head Isle") from the shape of its outline.

=== Ferris wheel ===
The "Star of Lake Tai" is a giant, 115-meter (377 ft) ferris wheel on the shore of the lake. Completed in 2008, it takes 18 minutes to complete one revolution. Passengers can enjoy the scenery of Lake Tai and the city center. At night, lighting effects are switched on around the wheel.

=== Landmarks ===
- Sheraton Huzhou Hot Spring Resort is situated on the southern shore of the lake.

=== Wuxi Scenic Area of Taihu ===
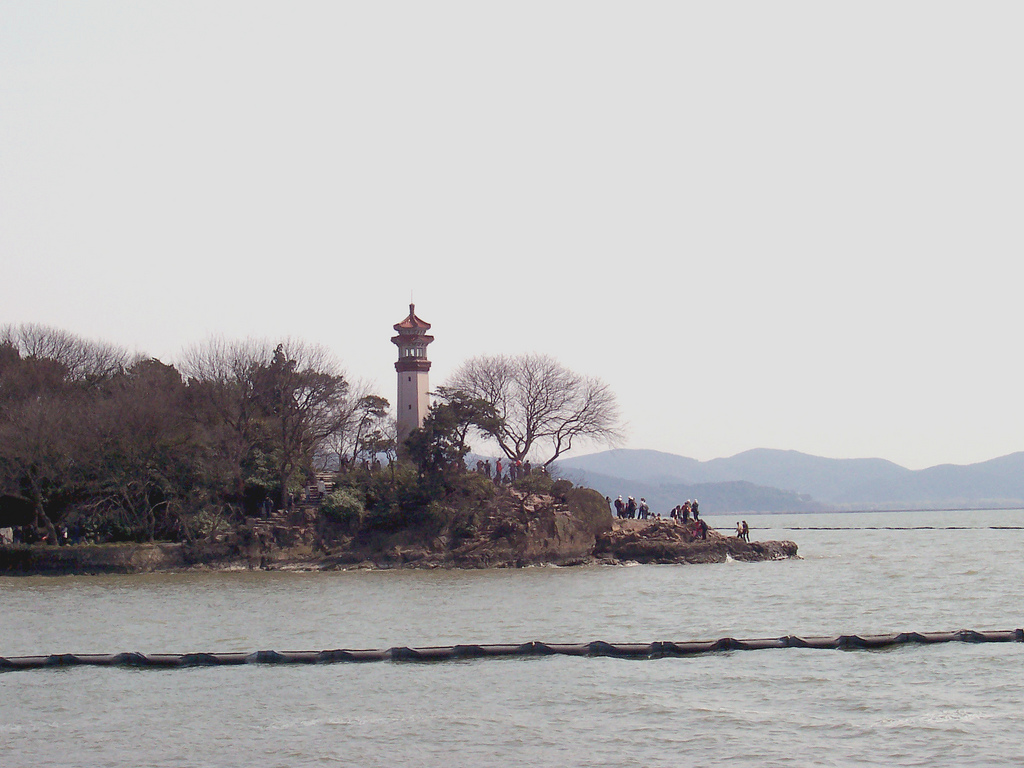
Yuantouzhu, near Wuxi

Yuantouzhu (Turtle Head Isle) is a prominent tourism site in Binhu District, Wuxi, situated between Taihu and Lake Li. Named for its turtle-head shape, it is referred to as "Taihu's finest spot, indeed at Yuantouzhu." The park was established in 1917, and wealthy locals built private gardens and villas nearby—including Hengyun Villa, Guangfu Temple, Taohu Villa, and Chen Garden. After 1949, these gardens were integrated into Yuantouzhu Park. In the 1980s, the park underwent master planning and expansion, adding over ten scenic spots—such as Chongshan's Hidden Beauty, Deer Peak Sunrise, Spring Waves, and the Cherry Blossom Friendship Grove—spanning more than 500 ha, making it one of Jiangnan's largest landscape gardens.

Liyuan Garden is located on the shores of Lake Li (part of Taihu). The garden features Taihu-style rockeries, a thousand-step lakeside corridor with 89 carved windows, and lakeside embankments. Named after the historical figure Fan Li, the site commemorates the story of Fan Li and Xi Shi boating on Li Lake.

Other famous scenic sites in Wuxi's Taihu area include Sanshan Park, Plum Garden (Meiyuan), Xihui Park, the "Second Spring under Heaven," and Jichang Garden.

==== Dongshan Scenic Zone (East Hill) ====
Dongshan (East Hill of Dongting Lake) is a peninsula on Taihu surrounded on three sides by water. Its main summit, Mali Peak (293.5 m), is the second highest among Taihu's peaks. The zone includes 11 islands such as Sanshan, Zeshan, and Jueshan. The town features preserved pavilions, Xi family gardens, and Ming-style nanmu halls, with other attractions like Zijin Temple and historic villages dotted throughout.

==== Taihu National Wetland Park ====
Located in Zhenhu Subdistrict, Huqiu District, Suzhou, Taihu National Wetland Park spans 4.6 km^{2} (2.3 km^{2} open in phase I). It conserves lakeside wetlands with zones for fishing, ecological display, habitat protection, education, and recreation. The park contains over 50 bridges and opened to the public in 2010.

== Business and industry ==
The lake is known for its productive fishing industry and is often covered by fleets of small private fishing boats. Since the late 1970s, harvesting food products such as fish and crabs has been invaluable to people living along the lake and has contributed significantly to the economy of the surrounding area.

The lake is home to an extensive ceramic industry, including the Yixing pottery factory, which produces Yixing clay teapots.

== Floods ==
The Wujiang Water Regulation Stele records 29 major flood events in Taihu Lake from 1194 to 1954. The 1991 flood ranked second in farmland impact after the 1954 flood.

Taihu's flood-control warning water level is 3.8 m, and the alert level at Wuxi's Grand Canal is 3.90 m. The regulated reservoir level is set at 4.65 m. The highest recorded average water level was 4.79 m on July 14, 1991, corresponding to a storage volume of 8.72 × 10^{9} m^{3}.

The Taihu Basin Authority oversees flood regulation through 59 sluice gates on surrounding outlets—including the Taipu sluice on the Taipu River (which discharges approximately 60% of floodwater), Yangwan Gate, Guajing Gate, Xin Kai River Gate, among others—extending into Yangtze and Huangpu systems.

The lowest inflow year on modern record was 1978, with an annual lake inflow of just 0.24 × 10^{8} m^{3}, approximately 0.46% of the average annual inflow.

Modern hydrological studies confirm that 1954 and 1991 rank as the two highest average annual lake levels over a 45-year continuous gauge record, correlating with regional precipitation and anthropogenic changes.

Flood control in the basin is guided by long-term water level records and contemporary hydrological analysis performed by the Hydrology Bureau of the Taihu Basin Authority.

== Pollution ==
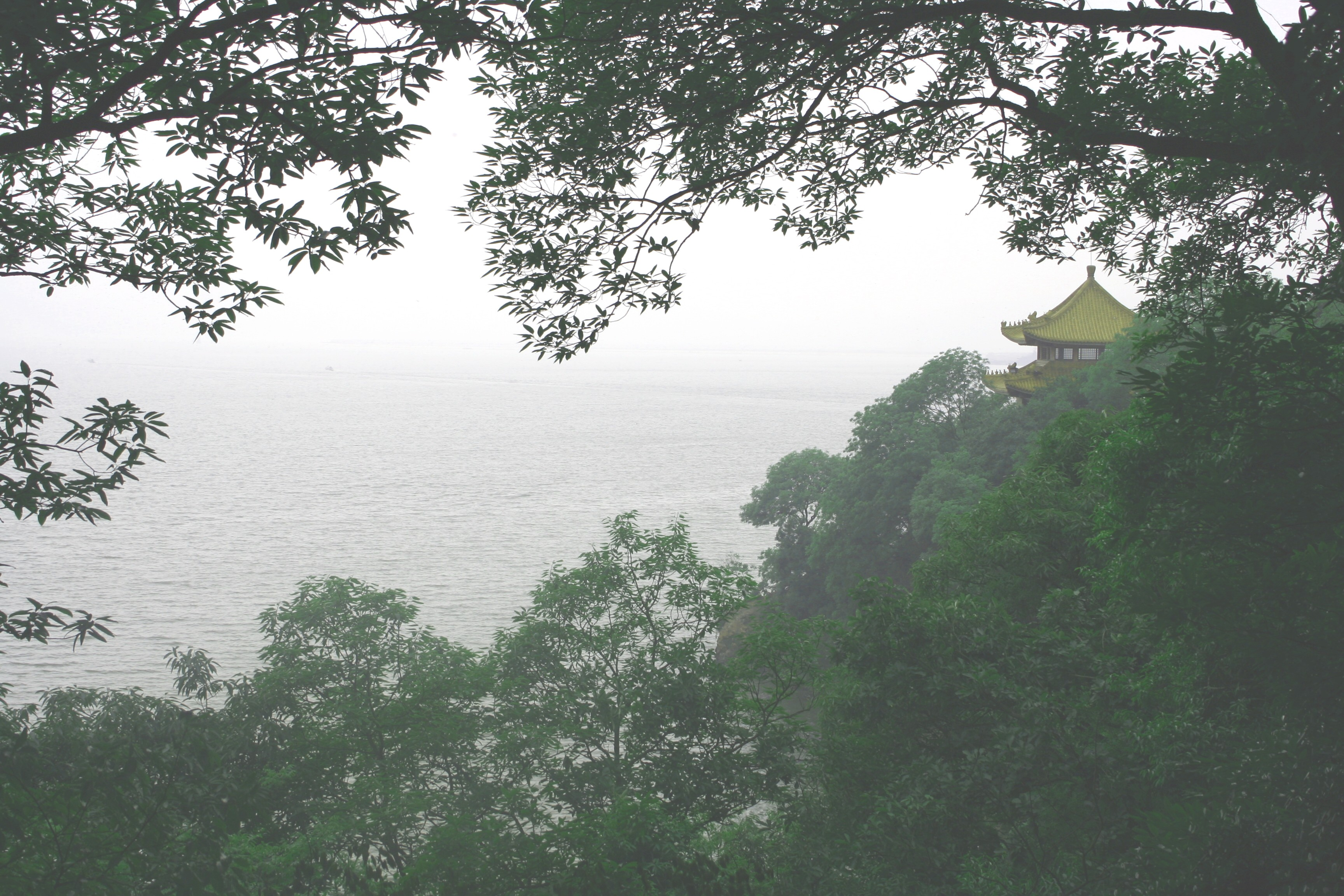
Lake scene at Wuxi

Pollution of the lake has been ongoing for decades despite efforts to reduce pollution that were not sustained and thus proved ineffective. In the 1980s and 1990s, the number of industries in the lake region tripled, and the population also increased significantly. One billion tons of wastewater, 450,000 tons of garbage, and 880,000 tons of animal waste were dumped into the shallow lake in 1993 alone. The central government intervened and initiated a campaign to clean up the lake, setting a deadline to comply with pollution standards. When the deadline was not met, 128 factories were closed on New Year's Eve in 1999. Compliance improved somewhat afterward, but the pollution problem remained severe.

In May 2007, the lake was overtaken by a major algae bloom and by major pollution with cyanobacteria. The Chinese government called the lake a major natural disaster despite the anthropogenic origin of this environmental catastrophe. With the average price of bottled water rising to six times the normal rate, the government banned all regional water providers from implementing price hikes. (The lake provides water to 30 million residents, including about one million in Wuxi.) By October 2007, it was reported that the Chinese government had shut down or given notice to over 1,300 factories around the lake. Nonetheless, Wu Lihong, one of the leading environmentalists who had been publicizing pollution of the lake, was sentenced to three years in prison for alleged extortion of one of the polluters, but, undeterred, alleged in 2010 that not a single factory was closed.

Jiangsu province planned to clean the lake; chaired by then prime minister Wen Jiabao, the State Council set a target to complete the task by 2012. However, in 2010 The Economist reported that pollution had broken out again and that Wu Lihong, released from prison that April, was claiming that the government was trying to suppress news of the outbreak while switching to other supplies in place of lake water.

== See also ==
- List of possible impact structures on Earth
