= Needleman (disambiguation) =

A needleman or needlewoman is a needleworker, a person who practices the handicraft or profession of needlework.

Needleman may refer to:

- Needleman (surname)
- Needleman (Dungeons & Dragons), creature in the Dungeons & Dragons series
- Needle Man, a boss in the video game Mega Man 3

Needlewoman may refer to:

- The Needlewoman, a painting by Diego Velázquez
- A Needle Woman, a performance video artwork by Kimsooja
