= Baojie Bridge =

Baojie Bridge 宝界桥
- Coordinates: 31°31′02″N 120°14′25″E
- Carries: Pedestrians and bicycles
- Crosses: Li Lake
- Locale: Binhu District, Wuxi, Jiangsu, China

Characteristics
- Design: Arch bridge
- Material: Stone
- Total length: 390.74 metres (1,282.0 ft)
- Width: 18.5 metres (61 ft)

History
- Construction end: 1934
- Construction cost: 30 million yuan
- Opened: 16 October 1994
- Rebuilt: 1994

Location
- Interactive map of Baojie Bridge

The Baojie Bridge (simplified Chinese: 宝界桥; traditional Chinese: 寶界橋; pinyin: Bǎojiè Qiáo) is a historic stone arch bridge over the Li Lake in Binhu District of Wuxi, Jiangsu, China.

== History ==
The bridge was originally built by Rong Desheng, a prominent industrialist from Wuxi, in 1934, for his 60th birthday. The bridge is 375 metres (1,230 ft) long and 5.6 metres (18 ft) wide, with 60 bridge openings.

In the 1990s, due to the development of the Yuantouzhu Scenic Area (鼋头渚风景区), the China Central Television (CCTV) continued to build the Tang Dynasty City (唐城), the Three Kingdoms City (三国城) and the Water Margin City (水浒城) as film and television bases in the south of Baojie Mountain (宝界山), which attracted a large number of tourists and caused serious traffic congestion at Baojie Bridge. Larry Yung, the grandson of Rong Desheng, donated 30 million yuan to build a new bridge, 390.74 metres (1,282.0 ft) long and 18.5 metres (61 ft) wide, 10 metres (33 ft) east of the old bridge. The opening ceremony was held on 16 October 1994. In December 2011, it was inscribed as a provincial key cultural unit by the Government of Jiangsu.

== Gallery ==
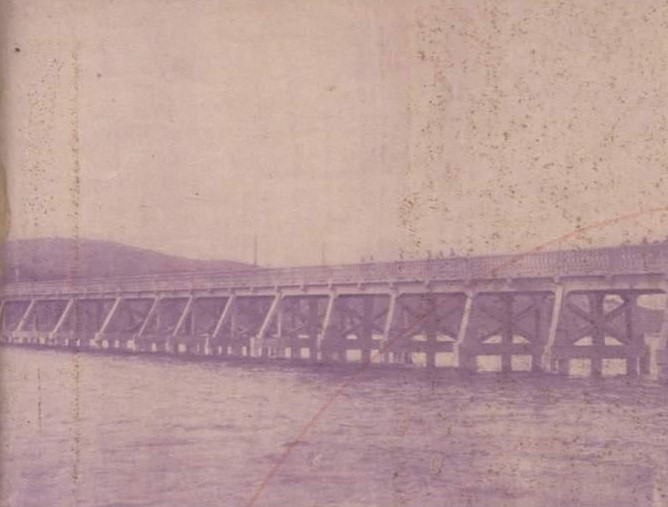
Old Baojie Bridge in the 1930s

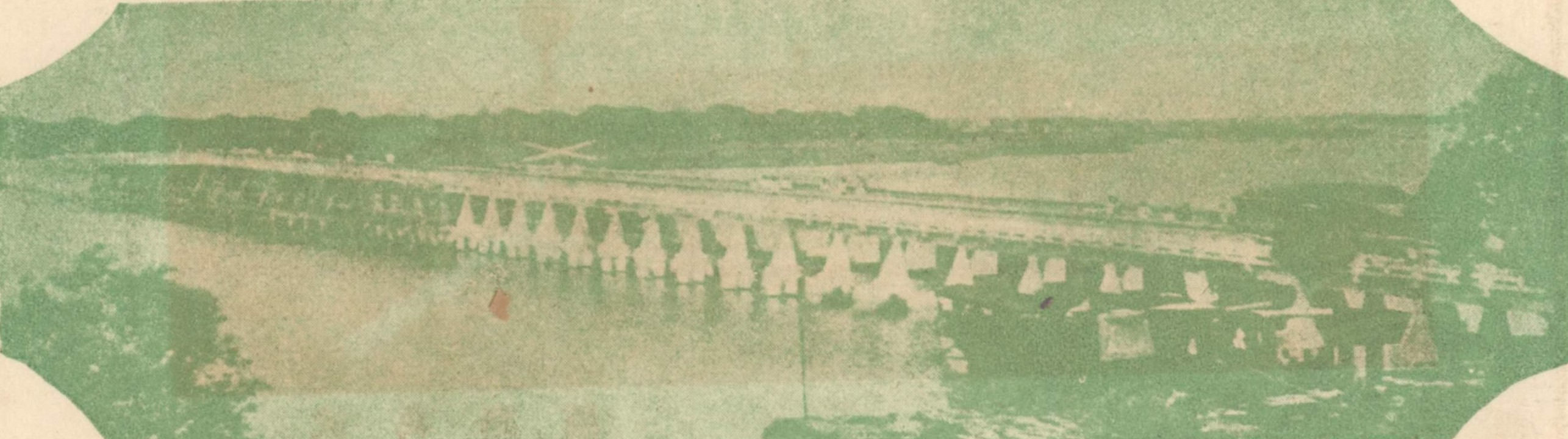
Old Baojie Bridge in 1934

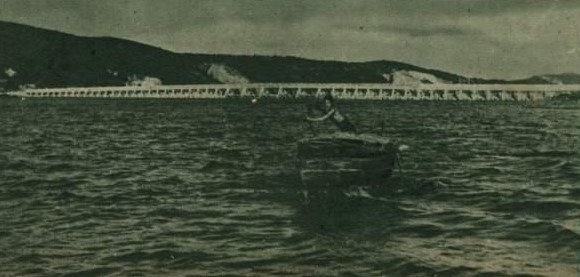
Old Baojie Bridge in 1934
