= James Jean =

Taiwanese-American painter (born 1979)

- Born: 1979 (age 46–47); Taipei, Taiwan
- Education: School of Visual Arts
- Known for: Painting

James Jean (born 1979) is a Taiwanese-American visual artist working primarily in painting and drawing. He lives and works in Los Angeles, where he moved from New York in 2003.

== Early life ==
Jean was born in Taiwan and raised in New Jersey. During his early education, he explored various forms of artistic expression, including the piano and trumpet. He attended the School of Visual Arts in New York City, from which he graduated in 2001.

== Early career ==
In 2001, Jean became a cover artist for DC Comics and Marvel Comics, garnering seven Eisner awards, three consecutive Harvey awards, two gold medals and a silver from the Society of Illustrators of Los Angeles, and a gold medal from the Society of Illustrators of New York. He illustrated covers for the comic book series Fables and The Umbrella Academy, for which he has won six Eisner Awards for "Best Cover Artist". Jean won the 2005 Wizard Fan Award for Favorite Cover Artist for Fables. In 2006, he won Best Artist from the World Fantasy Awards.

He also worked in advertising, and has contributed to many national and international publications. His clients included Time Magazine, The New York Times, Rolling Stone, Spin, ESPN, Atlantic Records, Target, Linkin Park, Playboy, Knopf, Prada among others. He also did the album art for My Chemical Romance 's album The Black Parade, which was released in 2006.

== Present career ==
In 2008, Jean retired from illustration projects in order to focus on painting. Combining abstract figuration with loose, gestural marks, Jean creates layered compositions that evoke personal or collective experiences. Dream-like and at times disorienting, his works are expressive of narratives unbounded in time or space, and draw upon art historical antecedents ranging from Baroque painting traditions to Japanese woodblock prints and Chinese silk scroll paintings.

=== Sketchbooks ===
Sketchbooks have sustained a vital space in Jean's practice, solidifying importance in his time during art school as a rejection of the strict academic focus of visual arts studies. In favor of the freedom found in sketching during his childhood, Jean embraced sketchbooks as a means of exploring figures and imaginative creatures, synthesizing doodles, line drawings, and journalistic elements with more polished compositions in black-and-white and color. For Jean, sketchbooks are spaces for both experiment or study and for finished artworks in their own right.

== Notable works ==
Prada advertisement featuring James Jean designs.

=== Prada ===
In 2007, Jean created a mural for the Prada Epicenter stores in New York and Los Angeles. He also created a backdrop for Prada's Spring/Summer 2008 show in Milan.

Aspects of the Epicenter mural and the Milan wallpaper were transformed into clothing, handbags, shoes, and packaging. Prada undertook a global campaign that featured Jean's work in advertising environments, animation, and special events.

In 2008, Jean again collaborated with Prada, developing an animated short based on the wallpapers, clothing, and accessories produced in 2007. He wrote, storyboarded, and did the visual development for the animation, which would be eventually titled "Trembled Blossoms", taken from the poem "Ode to Psyche”, by John Keats.

Jean reunited with Prada to create prints for its Resort 2018 collection. He described the visual effect as a "tangle of floral elements occasionally populated and overrun by rabbits." Prada brought the collection to Shanghai as part of the brand's unveiling of Rong Zhai, a 20th-century mansion it restored, and exclusive looks were debuted in vivid reds, yellows, and blues.

Jean's images were used for the brand's SS2018 Menswear collection. His work also served as the set design for the collection's premiere at the Via Fogazzaro space. Jean's collaboration with Prada brought images inspired by graphic novels to high-fashion pieces, blending the superhuman with the human, and with a nod to the thick black lines that divide illustration panels.

=== Film artwork ===
Jean created the poster art for three films in 2017: Darren Aronofsky’s mother!, Guillermo del Toro’s The Shape of Water, and Denis Villeneuve’s Blade Runner 2049. Employing different media for each artwork, he hand-painted two character posters for mother! (one for Jennifer Lawrence and another for Javier Bardem), made a charcoal drawing for The Shape of Water, and used digital drawing tools for Blade Runner 2049. As part of his creative process, Jean collaborated closely with both Darren Aronofsky and Guillermo del Toro. Del Toro, a long-time fan of Jean's work, describes his drawings as having "a delicate nature to them and beautiful line work that is at the same time realistic and sort of elevated into a style of his own." Jean later created poster art for Daniel Kwan and Daniel Scheinert's film Everything Everywhere All At Once. Jean's posters uniquely evoke the tone and mood of each film without overtly revealing depictions of plot.

== Notable exhibitions ==
Jean's first solo exhibition was held in 2009 at Jonathan LeVine (then located in the Chelsea neighborhood in New York), followed in 2011 by "Rebus," a solo presentation at Martha Otero Gallery (at the time located in the Fairfax district in Los Angeles).

In 2013, Jean's work was the subject of "Parallel Lives," a solo exhibition at Tilton Gallery in New York. Spanning both floors of the gallery, the show debuted a new body of work that fused personal with universal themes, and realism with mythology. Its title drawn from Plutarch's "Lives of the Noble Greens and Romans," also known as "Parallel Lives," the exhibition of paired works explored the tension created from "parallels."

Jean's work was included in "Juxtapoz x Superflat," organized by the Vancouver Art Gallery in 2016. Curated by artist Takashi Murakami and Juxtapoz editor Evan Pricco, the group exhibition brought together artists whose works had been included in the magazine and who had participated in or expanded upon Murakami's postmodern art movement Superflat. Jean's painting "Bouquet" served as the marquee image for the exhibition.

For "Azimuth," a 2018 solo exhibition at Kaikai Kiki Gallery in Tokyo, Jean presented drawings, paintings, and an installation of illuminated stained glass works, which he made at Judson Studios. The show centered on the radiance of color and light, with works driven by a force of optimism and innocence, informed in part by the joy of the artist's son.

=== Lotte Museum of Art ===
In 2019, Lotte Museum of Art in Seoul hosted "Eternal Journey," a major retrospective of Jean's work. Over 500 works were on view in the exhibition, including large-scale paintings, sculpture, installation, video art, 150 comic book covers, and more than 200 drawings that served as the inspiration for many of the included works. Nine large-scale paintings explored the theme of obangsaek, or the five fundamental or cardinal colors, a traditional color schema representative of the order of the universe.

Collaborating again with Judson Studios, the oldest family-operated stained-glass maker in the US, Jean created Gaia - Yellow Earth Center (2019), the centerpiece of the Lotte Museum of Art exhibition. The sculpture expands upon his earlier explorations into stained glass for "Azimuth," bringing his visual vocabulary to the traditional medium. Over eight feet in height, the illuminated sculpture, which combines water jet cutting, hand and airbrush painting, and fused glass, depicts the goddess Gaia with a slinking tiger in an all-over composition of natural and geometric elements.

The exhibition was on view from April 4 through September 1, 2019 and is accompanied by an exhibition catalogue with essays by Yoon-Kyung Kwon, Chief Curator at Lotte Museum of Art; Hee-Kyung Song, Art Historian and Professor at Ewha Womans University; and Christopher James Alexander, Architecture, Art, and Design Consultant, Principal of CJA Creative Collaborations.

== NFTs ==
On 4 March 2021, Jean sold his first NFT with his artwork Slingshot. It was auctioned on NFT platform Foundation and sold the next day for $469,696.35.

== Awards ==
In 2008, Jean collaborated with AIDES, a France-based non-profit community organization dedicated to fighting HIV/AIDS, in their print advertising campaign around the theme “Explore, Just Protect Yourself.” Jean's print campaign was awarded the Bronze Lion at the 2008 Cannes Advertising Festival.

== Publications ==
James Jean is the subject of numerous publications, including exhibition catalogues, artist's books, and thematic collections of his work.

- Process Recess (AdHouse Books, 2005)
- Process Recess 2: Portfolio (AdHouse Books, 2007)
- Xoxo: Hugs and Kisses (Chronicle Books, 2008)
- Fables: Covers (DC Comics, 2008)
- Process Recess 3: The Hallowed Seam (AdHouse Books, 2009)
- Kindling: 12 Removable Prints (Chronicle Books, 2009)
- Rift (Chronicle Books, 2010)
- Rebus (Chronicle Books, 2011)
- James Jean: Parallel Lives (Tilton Gallery, 2013)
- Memu: 100 Postcards (Chronicle Books, 2014)
- Fables: The Complete Covers (DC Comics, 2015)
- Xenograph (James Jean, 2015)
- Pareidolia (PIE Books, 2015)
- Zugzwang (James Jean, 2016)
- Azimuth (James Jean, 2018)
- Memu II: 100+ Postcards (James Jean, 2019)
- Eternal Journey (Lotte Museum of Art, 2019)
