= Kimsooja =

South Korean conceptual artist

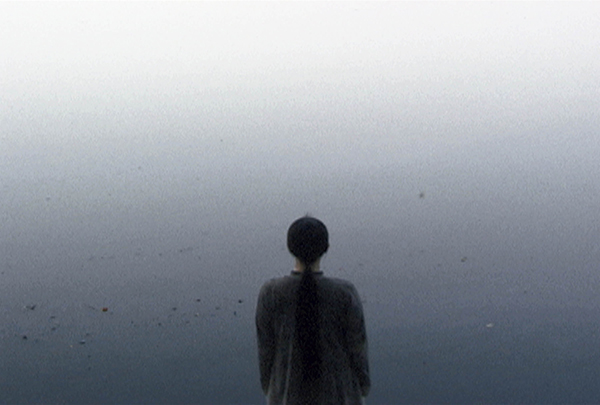
- Video still from A Laundry Woman; Yamuna River, India, 2000
- Born: Kim Soo-Ja; 1957 (age 68–69); Daegu, South Korea
- Education: Hongik University
- Known for: Conceptual and performance art

Korean name
- Hangul: 김수자
- RR: Gim Suja
- MR: Kim Suja

Kimsooja (Korean: 김수자; born 1957) was born in Daegu, South Korea. Kimsooja is a multi-disciplinary conceptual artist who travels between her three homes and places of work in New York City, Paris, and Seoul. In 1980 Kim graduated with a B.F.A in Painting from Hong-Ik University, Seoul and continued to pursue her M.F.A there, obtaining the degree in 1984 at the age of 27. Her origin as a painter was a crucial starting point for the development of her art. That same year, she received a scholarship to study art at Ecole Nationale Supérieure des Beaux-Arts in Paris, France, where she studied Printmaking. Her first solo exhibition was held in 1988 at Gallery Hyundai, Seoul. Currently, her work is featured in countless international museums and galleries as well as public art fairs and other spaces. Her practice combines performance, film, photo, and site-specific installation using textile, light, and sound. Kimsooja's work investigates questions concerning the conditions of humanity, while engaging issues of aesthetics, culture, politics, and the environment. Her principle of 'non-doing' and 'non-making,' which follows a conceptual and structural investigation of performance through modes of mobility and immobility, inverts the notion of the artist as the predominant actor.

Kimsooja's recent major projects include Sowing into Painting, Wanas Konst, Sweden, Traversées\Kimsooja, Poitiers, France (2019–2020), To Breathe, Public Commission for the new metro station Mairie de Saint-Ouen in Paris (2020), 21st century new stained-glass commission for the Saint-Etienne Cathedral in Metz, France (2021), Asia Society Triennial, New York (2020). Kimsooja has exhibited in major museums and institutions around the world, including Peabody Essex Museum (2019); Yorkshire Sculpture Park and Chapel (2018–2019); Perth Institute of Contemporary Arts (2018); Kunstmuseum Liechtenstein (2017); MMCA Korea (2016); Centre Pompidou Metz (2015); Guggenheim Museum Bilbao (2015); Vancouver Art Gallery (2013); Museum of Modern Art Saint-Etienne (2012); Pérez Art Museum Miami (PAMM) (2012); Baltic Center for Contemporary Art Gateshead, UK (2009); BOZAR, Brussels (2008); Crystal Palace, Museum Reina Sofia, Spain (2006); The National Museum of Contemporary Art, Athens (2005); Kunstmuseum Palast Düsseldorf (2004); Museum of Contemporary Art in Lyon (2003); PAC Milan (2003); Kunsthalle Wein (2002); Kunsthalle Bern (2001); MoMA PS1 (2001); Rodin Gallery, Leeum Samsung Museum of Fine Art (2000); ICC Tokyo (2001); and CCA Kitakyushu (1999).

== Name ==
After choosing a domain name for her website, Kimsooja explored the conceptual implications of presenting her name as a single word, which became the basis for A One-Word Name Is An Anarchist's Name (2003). She described this format as resisting distinctions of gender, marital status, and cultural or social identity by unifying the family and given name. The adoption of a one-word name also reflects her artistic development and asserts a sense of autonomy over her identity.

== Early career ==
The Earth (1984) at the National Museum of Women in the Arts in 2023

While in University, Kimsooja discovered her love for understanding the connection of aesthetics and human psychology which lead to the motive behind many of her works. Kimsooja references, from her first work to her most recent, how humans react to fabric, paint, sculpture and more, and how we experience the world as humans. Kimsooja's "Sewing" series (1983–1992), her first work with fabric, brought forth an assemblage of systems of horizontals and verticals. Her use of fabric evoked bottari cloth, a traditional Korean wrapping cloth, typically made and used by women. She utilized fabric forming cruciform structures that synthesized an entangled and knotted vision of society and the world into a system of horizontals and verticals. Like the Spatialist painter Lucio Fontana, who pierced the uni-colored canvas with a sharped-edged dagger, Kimsooja also made art that was no longer a screen of illusion but a three-dimensional structure as she weaved through the surface of the work, piercing holes into it. These early sewn works, in turn, were inspired by the fabric and clothes that her grandmother had owned, while also fueled by Kimsooja's own interest in the traditional association between female labor and needlework in Korean culture along with the dynamics of civic and domestic power and the noticeable disconnect of public and private space. Growing up female in South Korea during the mid to late 1990s, Kimsooja created work that many Korean women could relate to through their collective attempts to remove themselves from the patriarchal social systems at play. With such media she intertwines tradition with contemporary art and feminism in South Korea. Kimsooja's work forces spectators to separate the art from the artist and question humanity's existence.

Subsequent to a residency at MoMA PS1 in 1992–93, Kimsooja initiated a series of site-specific installations that found their origin in the Korean color spectrum (obangsaek). She created sculptures inspired from Korean bedcover cloth bundles that are associated in Korean culture with travel and migration, and may also be interpreted in her work as an allusion to restrictions on female activities. These bedcover bundles inspired the title of a number of sculptures and installation works that Kimsooja titled after the Korean word, bottari, that intimates the idea of travel but also refers to concepts of wrapping and unfolding.

In 1992, the installation Deductive Objects, shown at MoMA PS1, took up an entire brick wall where small torn pieces of used Korean bedcover fabric were inserted by the artist in tiny holes between the bricks. The sculptural elements alongside the wall installation were composed of everyday objects wrapped in Bottari cloth, such as a carrier, a doorframe, a hook, a saw, a spool, a shovel, a clothing rack, or a ladder. While any kind of fabric can be used to make bottari, Kimsooja favours second-hand clothes to allude to the passage of time and the objects' previous life before they were transformed into works of art.

== Performance and video works ==
=== Early performance and video works ===
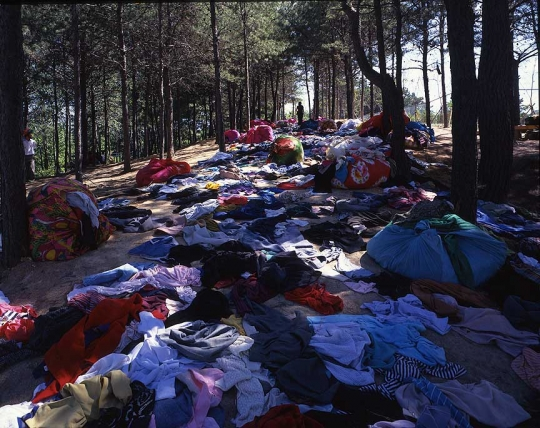
Kimsooja, Sewing into Walking - Dedicated to the victims of Kwangju, 1995

In Kimsooja's first video performance, Sewing into Walking-Kyungju (1994), Kimsooja is seen atop the valleys of Gwangju (formerly spelled Kwangju), South Korea, picking up scattered bedcovers on the valley's floor and wrapping them into a bundle. A year later, Kimsooja returned to the valley for the first Gwangju Biennale in Korea and scattered various clothes made of traditional Korean fabrics on the ground of a forest. This installation, made of 2.5 tons of second-hand clothes and entitled Sewing into Walking- Dedicated to the victims of Kwangju, commemorated the victims of the suppression of a democratic protest in Gwangju in 1980. This work established an analogy between the structure of fabric and that of the land, which was of particular importance in terms of confirming the three-dimensionality and spatial topology of fabric in Kimsooja's work, as well as establishing her body in performance as a needle that weaves through the fabric of humanity and nature.

=== Cities on the Move: 2727km Bottari Truck and Bottari Truck - Migrateurs ===
In Cities on the Move – 2727 km Bottari Truck, Kimsooja sits atop a mound of bottari being transported across the country. Documenting part of her 11-day performance on her journey to places she resided before she made a cultural exile from Korea to New York at the end of the 1990s.

In 2007, Kimsooja records her performance in Paris, where she contemplates our reality of constant migration in a global society that drives us as migrateurs of every society we come from and are heading toward. The Bottari Truck - Migrateurs was made of local immigrants' bedcovers and used clothing donated from all over Paris that was loaded on top of an old French Peugeot pick-up truck. Kim started from 'Place de la Liberation' where Musée MAC/VAL, which commissioned the piece, is located, and at the same time which is just on the border of south east of Paris, where many immigrants from China, the Middle East, Africa and Europe live. She moves on to different neighborhoods of Paris, which signifies the history of immigrants in France: Ivry (large Chinese community), Place d'Italy, Bastille, Place de la Republic, Canal Saint-Martin (which used to have tents along the canal area from homeless people, now much cleaned, making a water tunnel), Gare du Nord, Goutte d'Or (a large African, Middle Eastern, Indian community), to the destination 'Église Saint-Bernard', where most of the illegal immigrants settled down and protested their right to live in France in 1996; that has become a big political issue in French society.

=== A Needle Woman ===
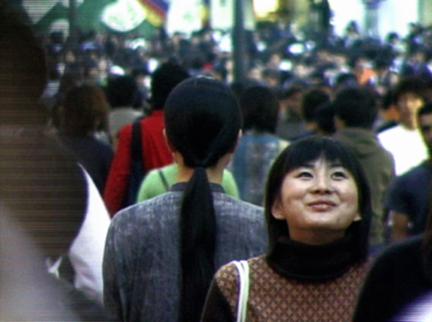
Video still of Kimsooja's 1999 performance "A Needle Woman."

In 1999, Kimsooja presented her most iconic work: A Needle Woman, a performance video piece that premiered at CCA Kitakyushu and further evolved in subsequent showings as a multi-channel video projection. In A Needle Woman, the artist is seen with her back facing the camera, wearing precisely the same clothes and standing precisely the same way in various metropolises: Tokyo, Shanghai, Delhi, New York, Mexico City, Cairo, Lagos, London, Patan, Nepal (1999–2001); and in a second series of performances: Havana, Cuba; N'Djamena, Chad; Rio de Janeiro, Brazil; Sana'a, Yemen; and Jerusalem (2005). Some locations visited in the work are places of violence, disrepair, or unresolved conflict, lending to the needle a metaphoric function as an instrument of healing. Also in A Laundry Woman (2000), a performance video piece shot in India, Kimsooja is seen immobile and standing in front of a river where debris seemingly drift. A Needle Woman and A Laundry Woman exposed the artist's stances on non-doing and immobility as a form of art practice; specifically, lending to the action of immobility the virtue of inverting an audience's linear perception of space and time. The first version of A Needle Woman presented the artist laying horizontally on a rock and it established nature and spatial orientation as a central subject in her work. As well, her use of the Korean color spectrum (Obangsaek), in which each color stands for a cardinal direction in Korean tradition, took up great importance.

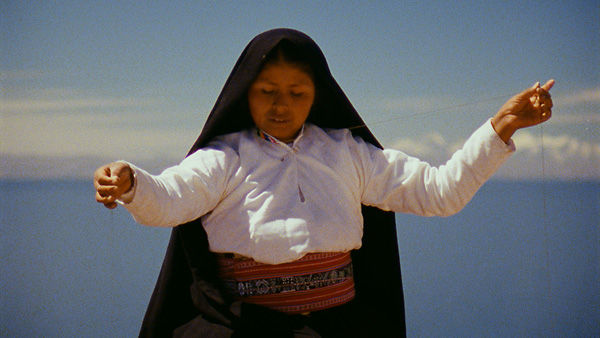
Kimsooja, Thread Routes - Chapter I, 2010

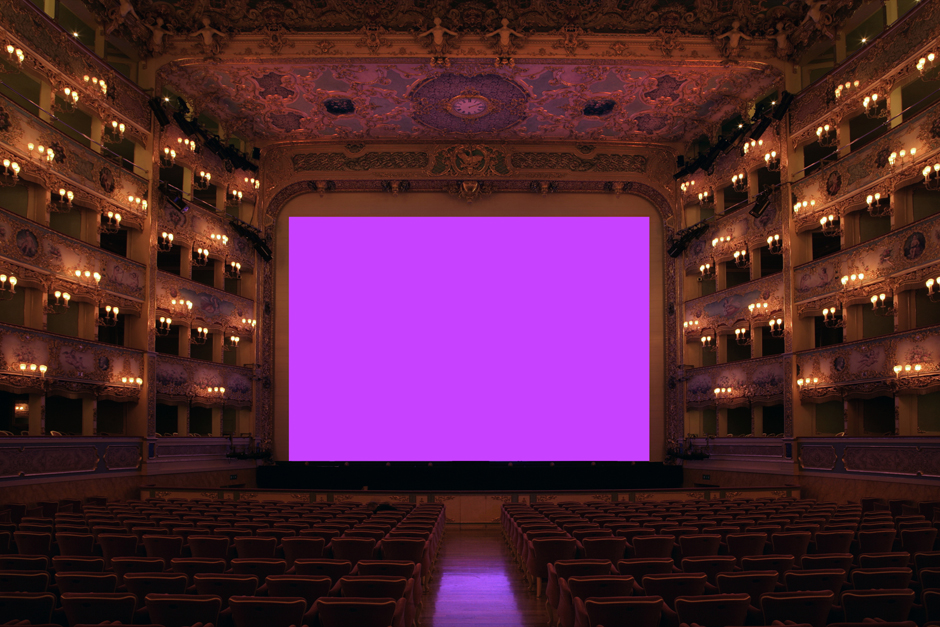
Kimsooja, To Breathe - Invisible Mirror / Invisible Needle, 2006.

=== Other video and film works ===
For A Mirror Woman: The Sun and The Moon, commissioned by the Shiseido Art Foundation in 2008, Kimsooja filmed the sun setting and the moon rising along the beach of Goa, India. The artist then digitally layered an eclipse, in which the footage of the Sun and the Moon were fused together.

In Earth – Water – Fire – Air, a multi-channel video projection that premiered at the 2009 Lanzarote Biennale, Spain, the fusion of basic elements was grasped live by the artist on the Island of Lanzarote in the Canary Island, Guatemala, and Greenland. Here, the concept of fusion enhanced the idea of earlier experiments in immobility, continually incarnated in the artist's persistent representation of permanence and impermanence, horizontal and vertical structures, the forward and backward movements of sewing.

Thread Routes is a 16mm film project initiated by Kimsooja in 2010, entitled Thread Routes. Divided into six chapters, the series unfolds as an "anthropological poem" centered on the act of threading. Filmed across six distinct cultural regions - Peru, Europe, India, China, North America and North Africa - the project examines shared practices of textile production while exploring broader themes of labor, tradition, and cultural continuity.

To Breathe: Invisible Mirror/ Invisible Needle, which premiered at La Fenice, Venice in 2006, was a nine-minute video projection of a color spectrum that filled the entirety of the theater's stage. A five-channel audio track entitled The Weaving Factory (2004) accompanied the piece, forming a couplet of inhalation and exhalation of the artist's own breathing that became increasingly less agile as the color spectrum continued its gestation.

== Site-specific installations ==
Over the last two decades, Kimsooja has developed works that uses lights and color–in parallel to Obangsaek color spectrum, which represents 5 cardinal directionality in Korean philosophy–in response to many historical and modern buildings.

A Lighthouse Woman (2002) was a site-specific installation where Kimsooja used light, color, and sound to transform the abandoned lighthouse in Morris Island (Charleston, South Carolina) for the 2002 Spoleto Festival. A Lighthouse Woman inaugurated a series of work the artist created as memorial projects that includes: Sewing Into Walking - Dedicated to the victims of Kwangju (1995); Planted Names (2002); Mandala: Chant for Auschwitz (2010); and A Mirror Woman: The Ground of Nowhere (2003). Another commemorative work, Kimsooja's An Album: Hudson Guild, is a video project created in collaboration with the Hudson Guild Senior Center in Chelsea, New York, in 2009.

To Breathe – A Mirror Woman, was developed for the Palacio de Cristal in Madrid in 2006, was a mirror installation that covered the flooring of the Palacio. The entire cupola of the palace was covered with a translucent film that diffracted daylight and the Palacio was also replete with the sound of the artist's breathing.

In Lotus: Zone of Zero was first installed at Palais Rameau, Lille, Kimsooja hung six rows of concentric circles consisting of 384 temple lanterns in the shape of lotus blossoms from the glass pavilion. Six speakers aligned the circle simultaneously played Gregorian, Tibetan, and Islamic chants, which echoed throughout the room and united at the hollow center. According to Kimsooja, this is the realm of "Zero," in which different faiths form a harmonious union that transcends into a space for meditation and contemplation. The many lanterns hung overhead were meant to humble the viewer and remind them of their relationship with their community. Kimsooja created Lotus: Zone of Zero in response to the Iraq War; she wanted to create a place where different religions and people of different cultures could live in a state of harmonious coexistence.

Kimsooja represented Korea for the South Korean pavilion at the 55th Venice Biennale in 2013. For the piece entitled To Breathe: Bottari, Kimsooja wrapped the entirety of the national pavilion's interior with a translucent film that diffracted daylight, showering the internal structure with spectrums of light. Her sound piece The Weaving Factory (2004–2013) also filled the pavilion with the sound of the artist inhaling and exhaling. These aspects of light and sound were further heightened by To Breathe: Blackout (2013), an anechoic chamber where the audience would be cast in complete darkness and devoid of sound except for that of the viewer's own body.

Other notable public commissions include: A Needle Woman: Galaxy was a Memory, Earth is a Souvenir (2014), a monumental 46-foot-tall sculpture commissioned and installed for the Cornell Council for the Arts 2014 Biennial on the campus of Cornell University; and Mandala: Zone of Zero, which premiered at The Project in New York City in 2003 and consisted of the sound of Tibetan, Gregorian, and Islamic chants animating a large target-shaped jukebox.

Traversees/Kimsooja (2019) saw the artist take over the City of Poitiers for the first edition of the international cultural event, presenting more than a dozen site-specific installations across historic monuments, including Archive of Mind (2019), To Breathe (2019), To Breathe - The Flags (2019), and Bottari 1999-2019 (2019), a shipping container painted in Obangsaek colors and filled with personal belongings accumulated over two decades, symbolizing her nomadic practice.

Sowing into Painting (2020), installed in Wanås, Sweden, combined film, sculpture, painting, and agriculture by planting a field of flax to reflect cycles of material production, exploring themes of impermanence, transformation, and the relationship between life and art.

To Breathe (2023), a permanent installation at the Mairie de Saint-Ouen metro station in Paris, features light-diffracting glass walls installed in the station concourse, integrating Kimsooja's exploration of light and space into a public environment.

== Exhibitions (selection) ==
Kimsooja's exhibition history reflects her ongoing exploration of movement, identity, and cultural connection through performance, video, and installation. From early works such as A Needle Women to recent projects like To Breathe - Constellation, her practice has developed a distinctive artistic language centered on the body and its relationship to space. This selection of exhibitions highlights the global scope of her work, spanning major museums, biennales, and public sites worldwide, and demonstrates both the evolution of her artistic vision and her lasting impact on contemporary art.

- To Breathe – Constellation, Bourse de Commerce, Paris, France, 2024
- Kimsooja - (Un)folding Bottari, The Museum für Asiatische Kunst and The Ethnologisches Museum, Humboldt Forum, Berlin, Germany, 2023
- Kimsooja, To Breathe, Metz Cathedral, Metz, France, 2022
- BIENALSUR 2021, Buenos Aires: Chapter 1 - Kimsooja: The Encounter with the Other, Chapter 2 - Nomad, Chapter 3 - An Inner Experience, Buenos Aires, Argentina, 2021
- We Do Not Dream Alone, Inaugural Asia Society Triennial, New York, USA, 2020
- Kimsooja: Sowing into Painting, Wanås Foundation, Wanås, Sweden, 2020
- Traversées\Kimsooja, Inaugural biennale featuring more than ten site-specific installations, Poitiers, France, 2019
- Kimsooja: To Breathe, Yorkshire Sculpture Park, Wakefield, UK, 2019
- Kimsooja: Archive of Mind, Peabody Essex Museum, Salem, USA, 2019
- Zone of Nowhere, PICA, Perth Institute of Contemporary Arts, Perth, Australia, 2018
- To Breathe - The Flags, Perth Festival, Perth, Australia, 2018
- Weaving the World, Kunstmuseum Liechtenstein, Vaduz, Liechtenstein, 2017
- KIMSOOJA / Archive of Mind, MMCA, Seoul, Korea, 2016
- Kimsooja, To Breathe, Centre Pompidou Metz, 2015
- Kimsooja, Thread Routes, Guggenheim Bilbao, 2015
- Kimsooja, To Breathe: Bottari, The Korean Pavilion, 55th Venice Biennale, Venice, Italy, 2013
- Kimsooja / Unfolding, Vancouver Art Gallery, Vancouver, Canada, 2013
- Kimsooja, Mumbai: A Laundry Field, Feldkirch Church, Co-organized by Kunstmuseum Lichtenstein, Lichtenstein, 2010
- A Needle Woman - Paris, Hôtel De Ville Paris, Commissioned by Nuit Blanche, Paris, France, 2009
- Black Box: Kimsooja, Hirshhorn Museum and Sculpture Garden, Washington D.C., United States, 2008
- Kimsooja, To Breathe - A Mirror Woman, a site-specific installation at the Crystal Palace, commissioned by Museo Nacional Centro de Arte Reina Sofía, Madrid, Spain, 2006
- Kimsooja, To Breathe / Respirare, A Site-Specific Installation at La Fenice Theater, in conjunction with a joint Solo Exhibition at Fondazione Bevilacqua la Masa, Venice, Italy, 2006
- Kimsooja, To Breathe: Invisible Mirror / Invisible Needle, Theatre Chatelet, Commissioned by Nuit Blanche Paris, France, 2006
- Kimsooja, A Wind Woman, The Project, New York, United States, 2006
- Kimsooja, A Wind Woman, Peter Blum Gallery, Chelsea New York, 2006
- Kimsooja, Conditions of Humanity, traveling solo show, Museum Kunst Palast, Düsseldorf, Germany; Padiglione d'Arte Contemporanea, PAC, Milan; Museum of Contemporary Art, Lyon 2004
- Kimsooja, A Laundry Woman, Kunsthalle, Wien, Austria, 2002
- Kimsooja, A Needle Woman, P.S.1 Contemporary Art Center / MOMA, New York, United States, 2001
- Kimsooja, A Needle Woman, Kunsthalle Bern, Bern, Switzerland 2001
- Kimsooja, Bottari, Sprengel Museum, Hanover, Germany, 2001
- Kimsooja, A Needle Woman, ICC, Tokyo, Japan, 2000
- Kimsooja, Bottari Truck in Exile, 48th Venice Biennale, Venice, Italy, 1999

== Awards, fellowships and commissions (selection) ==
- The 34th Fukuoka Prize (Arts and Culture), 2024
- Okgwan, The Order of Cultural Merit, 2021
- Medal of the City of Poitiers, 2019
- Asia Society Arts Award, Hong Kong, 2017
- Kim Se-Choong Sculpture Award, Seoul, Korea, 2017
- Chevalier de l'Ordre des Arts et des Lettres from the French Minister of Culture, France, 2017
- Ho-Am prize for the Arts, Ho-Am foundation, South Korea, 2015
- A Needle Woman: Galaxy was a Memory, Earth is a Souvenir, commissioned by CCA on the occasion of first Cornell University Biennale Ithaca, New York, 2014
- John Simon Guggenheim Memorial Foundation Fellowship, 2014
- Grant recipient, New York State Council on the Arts, New York An Album: Hudson Guild commissioned by More Art, New York, 2009
- A Needle Woman - Paris, Hôtel De Ville Paris, Commissioned by Nuit Blanche, Paris, France, 2009
- Grant recipient, New York State Council of the Arts, An Album: Hudson Guild, commissioned by More Art, New York, 2009
- Musee d'Art Contemporain du Val-de-Marne, 2008
- Kimsooja, To Breathe: Invisible Mirror / Invisible Needle, Theatre Chatelet, Commissioned by Nuit Blanche Paris, France, 2006
- Korea Culture & Arts Foundation Grant, Seoul, for Always a Little Further, the 51st Venice Biennale, Arsenale, Venice, 2005
- Anonymous Was A Woman Foundation Award, New York, Artist of the American Art Award, Whitney Museum of America, Sponsored by Cartier Co., New York, 2002
- Korea Culture & Arts Foundation Award, Seoul, Award for the Best Show of the Year 2000, for the solo exhibition A Needle Woman – A Woman Who Weaves the World at Rodin Gallery, Samsung Art Museum, Seoul, 2001
- Paradise Culture Foundation Award, Seoul, 2000
- Residency Award, World Views – at World Trade Center, New York, awarded by the Lower Manhattan Cultural Council, New York, 1998
- Artist in Residence, PS1 Contemporary Art Center, New York, 1992–93
- The 11th Suk-Nam Fine Art Award, Seoul, 1992
- Song-Un culture Foundation Award, Seoul, 1991

== Biennials and triennials (selection) ==
- Traversées\Kimsooja, Inaugural biennale featuring more than ten site-specific installations, Poitiers, France, 2019
- The Second Yinchuan Biennale, Museum of Contemporary Art Yinchuan, Yinchuan, China, 2018
- Documenta 14: ANTIDORON - The EMST Collection, Fridericianum, Kassel, Germany, 2017
- Socle du Monde Biennale, HEART Herning Museum of Contemporary Art, Herning, Denmark, 2017
- Inhabiting the World - Busan Biennale 2014, Busan, South Korea, 2014
- Intimate Cosmologies: The Aesthetics of Scale in an Age of Nanotechnology. The 1st Cornell University Biennale Ithaca, New York, 2014
- The International Biennial of Contemporary Art of Cartagena de Indias, Colombia, 2014
- Korean Pavilion, The 55th Venice Biennale, Venice, Italy 2013
- ROUNDTABLE, The 9th Gwangju Biennale, South Korea, 2012
- Beyond Mediations, Poznan Biennale, Zamek Art Center, Poznan, Poland, 2010
- Dress Codes, The Third ICP Triennial of Photography and Video, International Center for Photography, New York, United States, 2009
- Against Exclusion - The 3rd Moscow Biennale, The Garage, Moscow, Russia, 2009
- The 4th Fukuoka Asian Art Triennial, 2009
- Always a Little Further, The 51st Venice Biennale, Arsenale, Venice, Italy, 2005
- The 10th Biennial of Moving Images, Geneva, Switzerland, 2003
- Ideal City - Solares, the 2nd Valencia Biennale, Valencia, Spain, 2003
- 71st Whitney Biennial, Central Park, Whitney Museum of American Art, New York, United States, 2002
- The 1st Busan Biennale, Metropolitan Museum, Busan, South Korea, 2002
- Sharing Exotism, The 5th Biennale de Lyon, Halle Tony Garnier, Lyon, France, 200
- D'APERTutto, The 48th Venice Biennale, Venice, Italy, 1999
- Third Asia-Pacific Triennial of Contemporary Art, Queensland Art Gallery, Brisbane, Australia, 1999.APT3 - Artist's Work
- The 24th São Paulo Biennial, São Paulo, Brazil, 1998
- Manifesta 1, Rotterdam, Netherlands, 1996
- The 1st Gwangju Biennale, Gwangju, South Korea, 1995
