= List of peninsulas of China =

The Shandong peninsula of China.

The peninsulas of China by province or region:

== Liaoning ==
- Liaodong Peninsula (辽东半岛)

== Shandong ==
- Shandong Peninsula (山东半岛)

== Jiangnan region ==
- Nantong peninsula (南通半岛)
- Yuantouzhu (鼋头渚)
- Chuanshan Peninsula (穿山半岛)
- Xiangshan Peninsula (象山半岛)

== Guangdong ==
- Leizhou Peninsula (雷州半岛)
- Dapeng Peninsula (大鹏半岛)

== Hainan Island ==
- Yangpu Peninsula (洋浦半岛)

== Hong Kong ==
- Kowloon Peninsula (九龙半岛)
- Sai Kung Peninsula (西貢半島)
- Clear Water Bay Peninsula (清水灣半島)
- Chung Hom Kok (舂坎角)

== Macau ==
- Macau Peninsula (澳门半岛)
