= Chen Wei (food scientist) =

Chinese food scientist

- 陈卫

President of Jiangnan University
- Incumbent
- Assumed office May 2020
- Preceded by: Chen Jian

Personal details
- Born: May 1966 (age 60) Jiangdu County, Jiangsu, China
- Education: Jiangnan University
- Scientific career
- Fields: Food biotechnology
- Workplaces: Jiangnan University

Chinese name
- Traditional Chinese: 陳衛
- Simplified Chinese: 陈卫
Transcriptions
Standard Mandarin
- Hanyu Pinyin: Chén Wèi

Chen Wei (Chinese: 陈卫; born May 1966) is a Chinese food scientist currently serving as vice-president of Jiangnan University.

== Biography ==
Chen was born in May 1966 in Jiangdu County, Jiangsu. He earned a bachelor's degree in 1988, a master's degree in 1995, and a doctor's degree in 2003, all from Jiangnan University. After graduation, he taught at the university, where he was promoted to associate professor in 2003 and to full professor in 2006. He was a visiting scholar at Wake Forest University in 2007 and the University of California in 2014.

== Honours and awards ==
- 2011 National Science Fund for Distinguished Young Scholars
- 2012 "Chang Jiang Scholar" (or " Yangtze River Scholar")
- 2018 National Technology Invention Award (Second Class)
- November 22, 2019 Member of the Chinese Academy of Engineering (CAE)

Educational offices
Preceded by Chen Jian	President of Jiangnan University; 2020–present	Incumbent
