= Sanshan Islands =

Sanshan Islands may refer to:

- Sanshan Islands, Yantai, in Yantai, Shandong Province, China
- Sanshan Islands, Suzhou, in Suzhou, Jiangsu Province, China
- Sanshan Islands, Wuxi, in Wuxi, Jiangsu Province, China
