= Chen Jian (engineer) =

Engineer and academician

- 陈坚

President of Jiangnan University
- In office 2005 – May 2020
- Preceded by: ?
- Succeeded by: Chen Wei

Personal details
- Born: 1 May 1962 (age 64) Wuxi County, Jiangsu, China
- Party: Chinese Communist Party
- Education: Tsinghua University; Jiangnan University
- Scientific career
- Fields: Fermentation; Light industry biotechnology
- Workplaces: Jiangnan University

Chinese name
- Simplified Chinese: 陈坚
- Traditional Chinese: 陳堅
Transcriptions
Standard Mandarin
- Hanyu Pinyin: Chén Jiān

Chen Jian (born 1 May 1962) is a Chinese engineer and an academician of the Chinese Academy of Engineering, formerly served as president of Jiangnan University from 2005 to 2020.

== Biography ==
Chen was born in Wuxi County, Jiangsu, on 1 May 1962. In 1979, he attended Tsinghua University, graduating in 1984 with a bachelor's degree in environmental engineering. He went on to receive his master's degree in 1986 and doctor's degree in 1990 at Wuxi Institute of Light Industry (now Jiangnan University) both in fermentation engineering. Since March 1990, he pursued advanced studies at Osaka University and Tokyo Institute of Technology in Japan and Inha University in South Korea.

He joined the faculty of Wuxi Institute of Light Industry in 1993, what he was promoted to deputy dean of the College of Bioengineering in 1995 and to vice president in 2001. In July 2005, he rose to become president of the university, and he held this post until 2020. He was honored as a Distinguished Young Scholar by the National Science Fund for Distinguished Young Scholars in 2006.

== Honors and awards ==
- 2013 Science and Technology Innovation Award of the Ho Leung Ho Lee Foundation
- 27 November 2017 Member of the Chinese Academy of Engineering (CAE)

Educational offices
| Preceded by ? | President of Jiangnan University; 2005–2020 | Succeeded by Chen Wei |
