= Thread Routes =

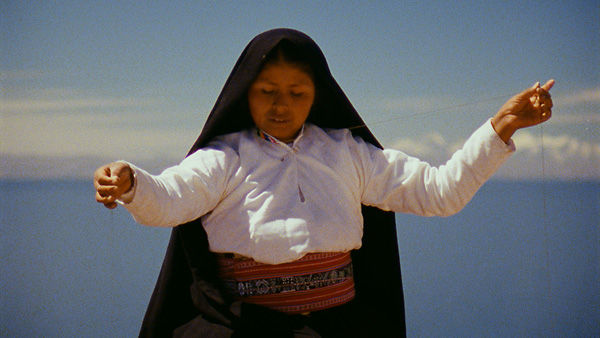
- Kimsooja, Thread Routes – Chapter I, film still, 2010
- Directed by: Kimsooja
- Produced by: Kimsooja Studio
- Cinematography: Immanuel Hick
- Running time: 16-25 minutes
- Country: United States
- Language: multiple

Thread Routes is a 16mm film series by artist Kimsooja.

Divided into six chapters, Thread Routes takes place in six different cultural zones around the world. The artist considers her approach to this film as a 'visual poem' and a 'visual anthropology', in that it juxtaposes and presents structural similarities in performative elements of textile culture with the structures in nature, architecture, agriculture and gender relationships in different cultures. These non-descriptive and unnarrative documentary films were conceived after being inspired in Bruges, Belgium, in 2002, by the performative elements of traditional lace making, and the city's architectural structure.

The first chapter, completed in 2010, explores Peruvian weaving culture, and its tight alignment with its landscapes and historic archaeological structures. This piece journeys throughout the country, from the Sacred Valley around Cusco and Machu Picchu to the Taquila Island villages, forming a non-linear timeline of the connection between people and their geographical environment.

Chapter II, which finished filming in the summer of 2011, focused on European lace making actions such as bobbin lace-making from Bruges (Belgium), Lepoglava and Pag (Croatia); industrial lace-making in Calais (France); needle point lace-making by nuns in a monastery in Hvar (Croatia) who use threads from dry aloe leaves; and traditional needlepoint on the small island of Burano (Italy). These scenes are set against representative European architecture such as the Milan Cathedral; the Eiffel Tower in Paris; and the Sedlec Ossuary in Kutná Hora (Czech Republic), which is decorated by human bones and skulls. Local vegetation and flowers overlap with scenes from Alhambra in Granada (Spain) which, in its detailed and complex decorative Islamic architectural forms, conveys a spatial sensibility and a spiritual dimension that is mirrored in lace-making. The bold, masculine, and power-oriented monumental architectural forms are revealed as similar acts to the delicate, feminine, and ephemeral textile making.

The third chapter (2012) journeys to India and studies the traditions of dyeing, sewing, weaving, embroidery, tattoo and woodblock printing; juxtaposing them with the archeological structures and temporary housing structures of the nomadic communities in Gujara, as well as the Step Well and the Sun Temple in Ahmedabad.

In 2014, Kimsooja filmed Chapter IV in China, where she encountered the specific weaving, dyeing and garment culture of the Miao minority in the Guizhou, Hainan and Yunnan provinces. These are depicted alongside elaborate silver adornment and paper making, as well as the ancient local housing structures in Fujian, the rice terraces of Yunnan and the landscapes of Guizhou and Hainan.

Shot in 2015 in New Mexico, Arizona and Utah, Thread Routes – Chapter V explores native American textile culture and the landscape inhabited by the various groups visited.

In early 2019 the last chapter was shot in Morocco.

The first three chapters were presented at Guggenheim Bilbao between March and July 2015.
