= The Plum Garden =

Chinese Garden

Coordinates: 31.554253°N 120.218548°E

The Chinese Plum Garden (Chinese: 梅园; pinyin: méi yuán) is a botanical garden on Lake Tai in Jiangsu, China. It is most prominent in spring when 4000 fruit trees blossom in the park.

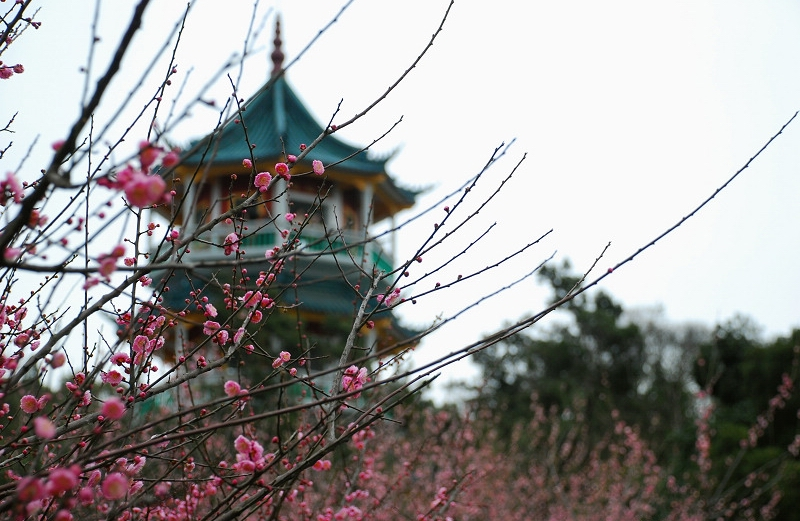
Meiyuan Nianqu Pagoda

Rong's Plum Garden, often referred as "The Plum Garden", is most famous for its many types of old plum trees, newly imported and planted Denmark tulips, as well as the old mansions of the Rongs family in Eastern China. It is located in the west part of Wuxi city, Jiangsu province, China.

== History ==
The garden was the old site of a house of Xu Dianyi who was a Qing dynasty scholar. In 1912 Wuxi Entrepreneur Rong Desheng the father of Rong Yiren purchased the land for the purpose of "Spread Fragrance to the World" and planted some 3000 plum trees. Because of the varieties of plum trees the place was named "The Plum Garden".

The garden circles Rong's previous mansion and leans up against Mt. Longshan. Inside gardens the old owner Rong and nowadays Plum Garden management office set up Tianxin stage, Xixin spring, Qingfen pavilion, Nianqu pagoda (Chinese: 念劬塔; pinyin: Niàn qú tǎ), Zhaohe pavilion, Xiaoluofu, Songbin hall, Huoran cave and Kaiyuan temple. The Nianqu pagoda was set up in 1930 for remembrance of 80th birthday of the dead mother of brother Rong Desheng and Rong Zongjing. It is the highest point of the plum garden and best place for watching blooming plum trees all over. Starting from Rong's family, The Plum Garden was called one of the three best places for appreciating plum trees in Jiangnan, together with plum trees in Mt. Dengwei of Suzhou and Mt. Chaoshan of Hangzhou.

In 1955, Rong Yiren donated whole garden (except for the private mansion) to the country. In 1960, the garden expanded to Mt. Hengshan of Wuxi, making its area more than 860 acres. In 1994 the garden was listed as "Wuxi heritage protection unit". In 2006 it was listed as "Major Historical and Cultural Site Protected at the National Level".

== Gallery ==
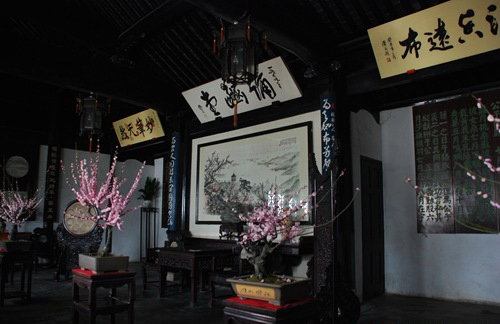
Inside Xiangxue pavilion

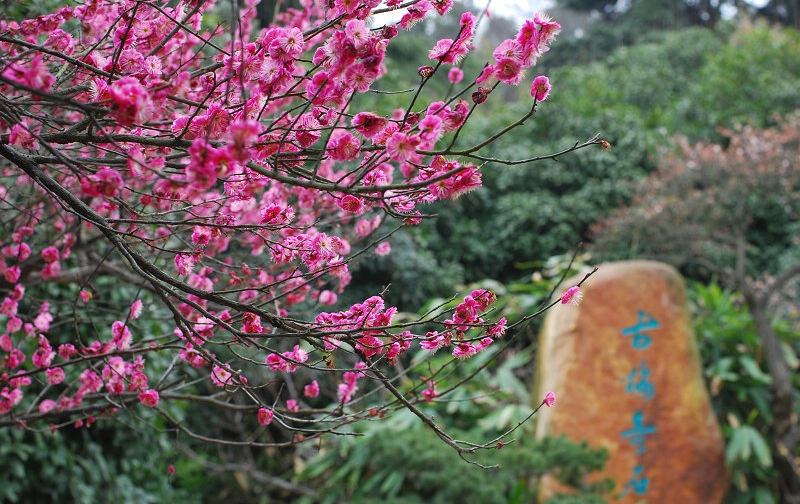
Entrance of Old Plums and Peculiar Stone museum (simplified Chinese: 古梅奇石馆; traditional Chinese: 古梅奇石館; pinyin: Gǔ méi qí shí guǎn),

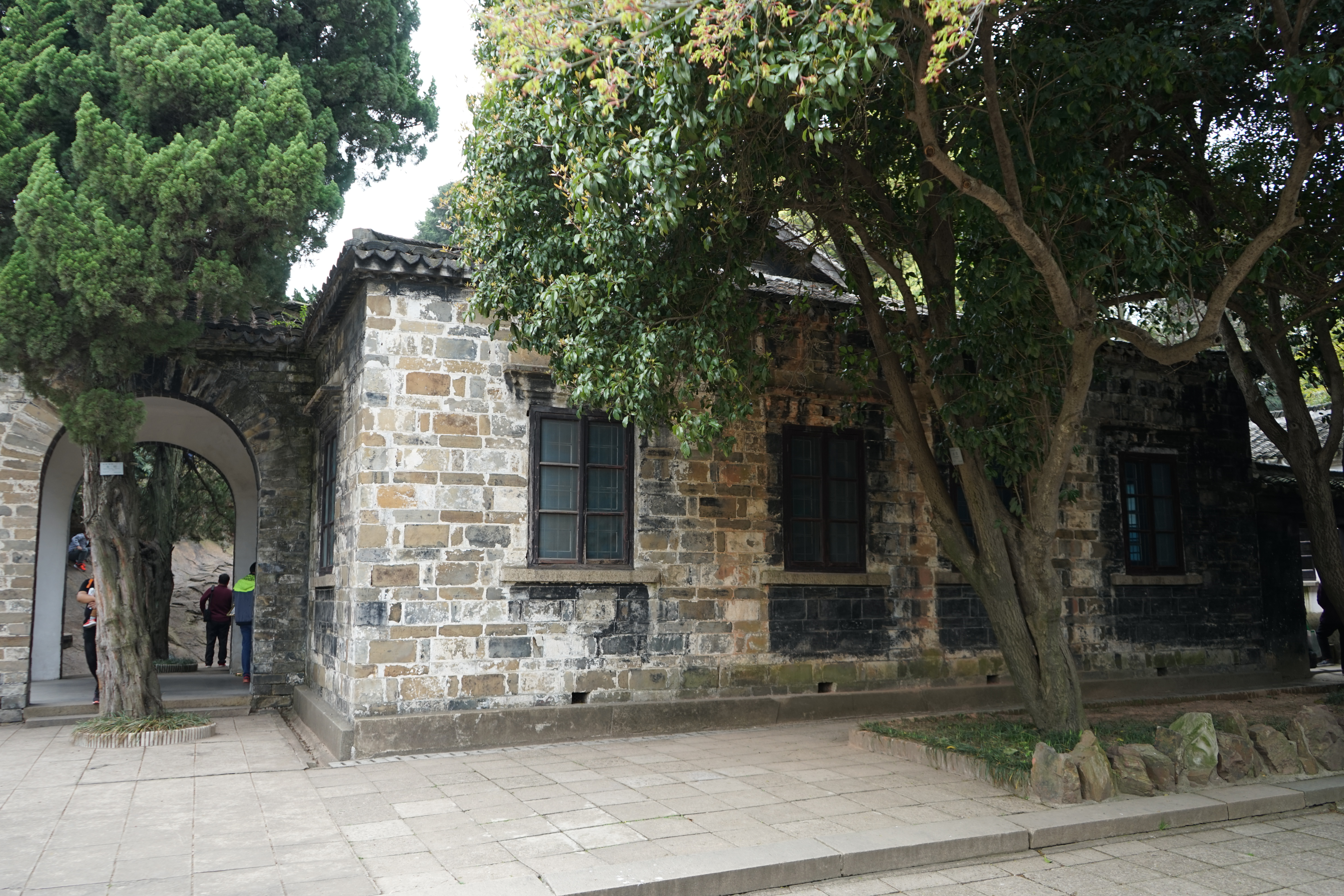
Lenong Villa, former residence of Rong Desheng

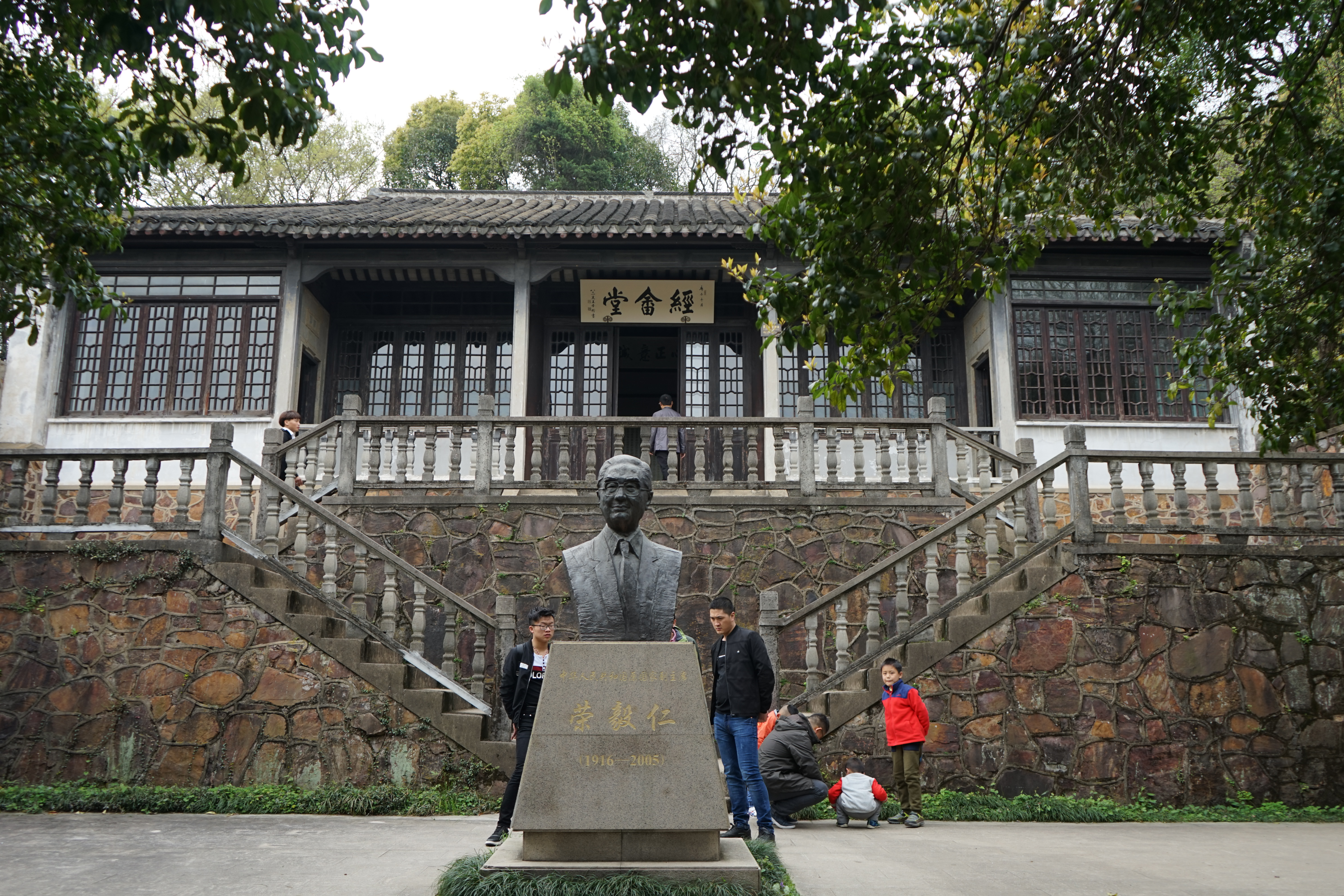
Reading House

== See also ==
- List of Chinese gardens
