= Rong Zhai =

Rong Zhai (Chinese: 荣宅; lit. 'Rong residence') is a standalone western-style house located on 186 North Shaanxi Road in Shanghai. It belonged to Rong Zongjing, a Chinese industrialist and national capitalist during the late Qing dynasty and the early Republic of China who was known as the "King of Flour". The house was purchased by Rong Zongjing in 1918 as one of his Shanghai homes.

== Description ==
The house is built in a western-style and is a standalone three-story home. Including the garden area, the total land space is 6.6 mu, 2,182 square meters of which are taken up by the house and 2,475 square meters for the garden.

Rong Zhai was designed in an Eclecticism style with reinforced concrete structure by Chen Chunjiang. The interior was decorated with a combination of French classicism and traditional Chinese elements. The outside structure and technology are mainly Western style while the inside arrangements had more of a traditional Chinese design.

== History ==
In 1918 Rong Zongjing purchased the house from a German person who had returned home to Germany after World War I, however the house was left empty for a long period of time by his family due to the need to develop the family business. In 1949, after the liberation of Shanghai, the Rong family rented the house to the China Economic Research Institute. The house was also rented to the media tycoon Rupert Murdoch in 2002 for ten years while he used it as his Shanghai office for the News Corporation. After Murdoch's lease was terminated, the house was rented to Prada in 2011 for a ten-year tenancy, with the intent to use it for "product promotion like fashion shows, public activities and exhibitions".

In 2004, the Rong Zhai was listed as a Culture Relic Protection Site of Jing'an district and honored with Heritage Architecture by Shanghai Municipal Government in 2005.

== Restoration ==
After Prada assumed tenancy, the brand began a six-year building renovation project to reflect Miuccia Prada and Patrizio Bertelli's interest in the city of Shanghai and Chinese aesthetic heritage. The renovation was also intended to repair damage to decorations on the inside and outside of the building as well as make necessary reinforcements to the building's structure. After the renovation was complete Prada held a great reopening on October 12, 2017.
