= Rong Zongjing =

Chinese businessman

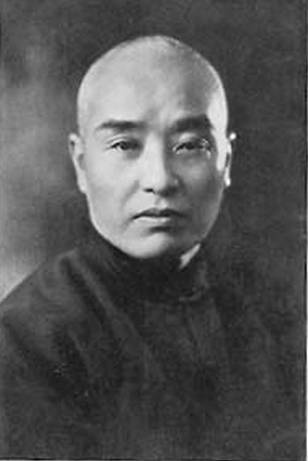
Rong Zongjing

Rong Zongjing (Chinese: 榮宗敬; September 23, 1873 - 1938) was a Chinese industrialist from Wuxi, Jiangsu. He was the older brother of Rong Desheng and the uncle of Rong Yiren. Rong went to Shanghai at the age of fourteen and worked as an apprentice at a native bank. Rong started his own native bank in 1896 with his father and brother, and then established a flour milling and textile empire in China that employed tens of thousands of workers.

== See also ==
- Rong Zhai
