= Needleman (surname) =

Needleman is a surname. Notable people with the surname include:

- Alan Needleman (born 1944), engineering professor
- Gastón Needleman, chess prodigy
- Jacob Needleman, philosopher
- Katherine Needleman, oboist
- Herbert Needleman, known for research studies on lead poisoning
- Rafe Needleman, magazine/website editor
- Saul Needleman, bioinformatician
