= A Needle Woman =

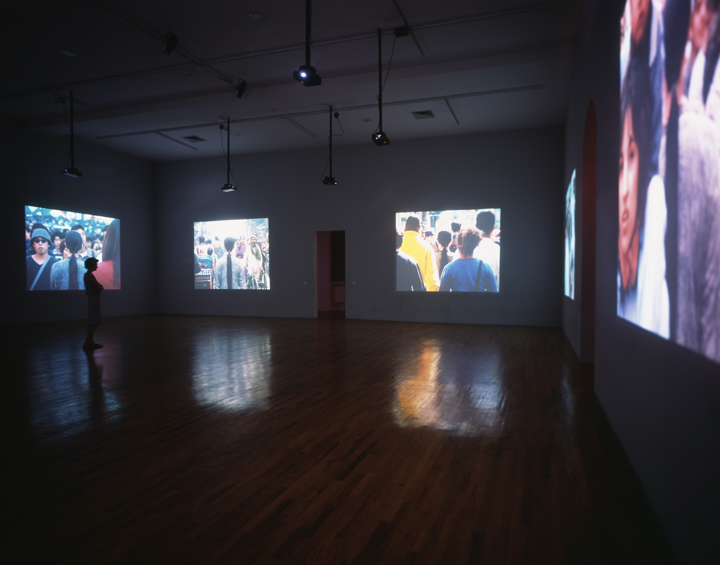
- PS1 MoMA, exhibition view, 2001

A Needle Woman is a performance video artwork created by artist Kimsooja. The videos projected simultaneously that comprise Kimsooja's A Needle Woman (1999) presents the artist wearing precisely the same clothes, standing precisely the same way, and, it would seem, at the same time of day in various urban environments.

== History ==
A Needle Woman premiered at CCA Kitakyushu in 1999. In the Kitakyshu version the artist presented a video channel where she lied on top of a rock formation, as Kimsooja explained "When I was invited to make a new commissioned work at the Center for Contemporary Art in Kitakyushu, Japan, I thought I would do a performance piece - one in the city of Tokyo, and the other one in nature. Then I would juxtapose them together. (...) As a result one was standing still in the middle of a crowd, while the other was lying down on a rock, facing nature. Verticality and horizontality were a metaphor for a dynamic balance between urban and natural forces." In further installations of A Needle Woman Kimsooja focused on the urban aspect of the work and shot a number of new videos where she stood absolutely still, her back facing the camera, amid passing crowds of inhabitants in Patan, Nepal; Havana, Cuba; N'Djamena, Chad; Rio de Janeiro, Brazil; Sana'a, Yemen; Jerusalem, Israel.

Kimsooja in these videos is often described as a nomadic figure traveling across the world to come to rest in a crowded thoroughfare. The Needle referred to in the title is Kimsooja theorizing herself as a needle passing through the fabric of a place and its people. A common feature of the locations visited in the work is that they are all places of violence, disrepair or unresolved conflict; lending to the needle a metaphoric function as an instrument of suture and healing. Subsequent versions of A Needle Woman were shown at MoMA PS1 Contemporary art center in 2001, at the Kunsthalle Bern in Bern Switzerland in 2001, for the 51st Venice Biennale as part of the Arsenale in 2005, and was projected as a single channel public art project for La Nuit Blanche on the facade of Hotel de Ville, Paris in 2009
