= Rong Desheng =

Chinese businessman (1875–1952)

- 榮德生
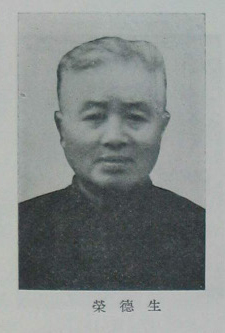
- Born: Rong Zongquan; 4 August 1875; Shanghai
- Died: 29 July 1952 (aged 76)
- Children: 13, including Rong Yiren
- Relatives: Rong Zongjing (brother)

Rong Desheng (Chinese: 榮德生; 4 August 1875 – 29 July 1952), born Rong Zongquan (榮宗銓), was a prominent Chinese industrialist from Wuxi. Along with his elder brother Rong Zongjing, he co-founded the Rong Family Corporation in Shanghai, which grew to become the largest domestic enterprise in the cotton textile and flour industries during the Republic of China era. Following Rong Zongjing's death in 1938 during the Second Sino-Japanese War, Rong Desheng assumed control of the business empire. Despite facing significant financial pressure and threats to his life, he refused to sell the enterprise to Japanese interests.

In the aftermath of the Second Sino-Japanese War, Rong Desheng was kidnapped twice by gangsters allegedly backed by corrupt officials within the Kuomintang (KMT), who attempted to extort money from him. After the establishment of the People's Republic of China in 1949, Rong chose to remain on the mainland and cooperated with the Chinese Communist Party (CCP). He was among the few capitalists who received favourable treatment from the new regime.

His son Rong Yiren later served as Vice President of the People's Republic of China in the 1990s. Another son, Rong Yixin (also known as Paul Yung), held the position of Senior Vice President at the China National Aviation Corporation.

== Biography ==
=== Early life ===
Rong Desheng was born in Wuxi, Jiangsu Province on 4 August 1875, corresponding to the fourth day of the seventh lunar month in the first year of the Guangxu Emperor's reign during the Qing dynasty.

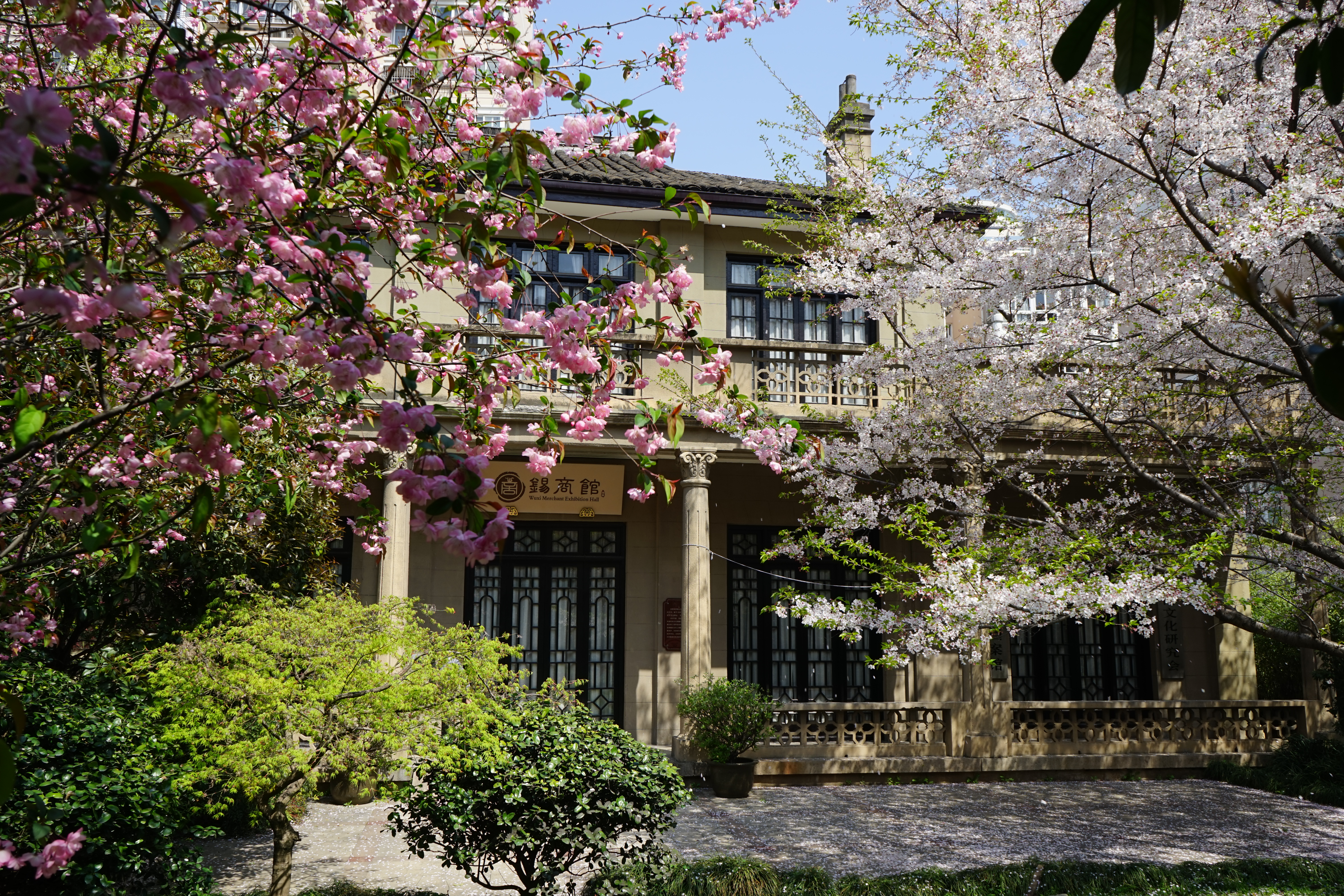
Former residence of Rong Desheng in urban Wuxi.

In 1884, he began formal schooling.

=== Early career ===
In 1890, Rong entered employment at the Shanghai Tongshun Bank.

In 1893, he accompanied his father to Guangdong to assist with accounting work at the Sanshui Lijin Bureau.

In 1897, he returned to Wuxi and was appointed manager of the Wuxi Branch of the Guangsheng Bank.

In the tenth lunar month of 1899, he was invited to serve as general accountant at the Bureau of Supplementary Taxation in Guangdong Province.

In 1901, Rong co-founded the Baoxing Flour Mill in Wuxi alongside his elder brother Rong Zongjing and others. The following year, he became the manager of the Maoxin Flour Mill.

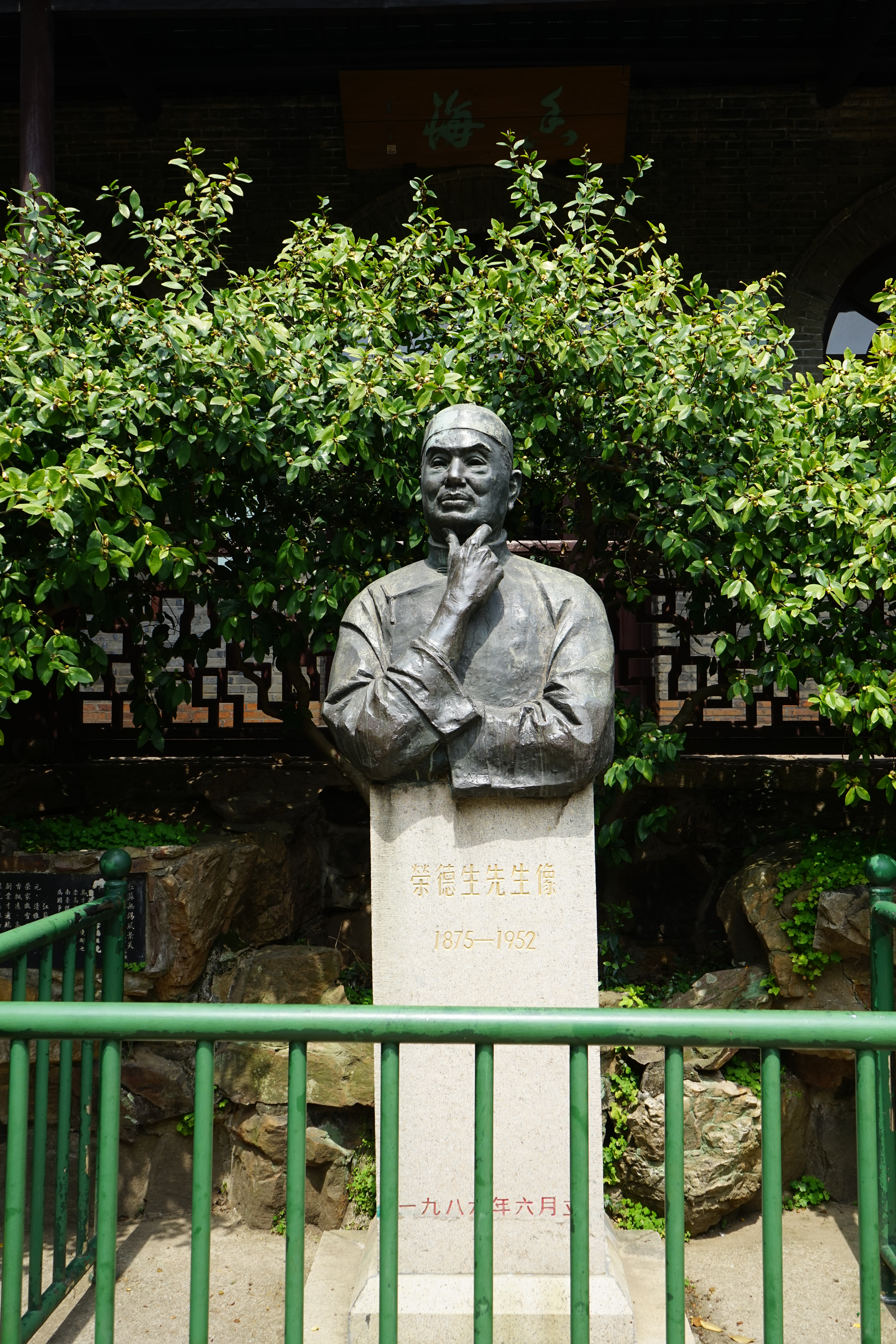
Statue of Rong Desheng in the Plum Garden

In 1905, he and Rong Zongjing, along with seven partners, established the Zhenxin Cotton Mill in Wuxi. Rong Desheng successively held positions as manager and general manager of the firm.

In 1912, the two brothers founded the Fuxin Flour Mill in Shanghai, with Rong Desheng serving as impartial director.

In 1913, Rong was elected as a representative at the National Conference of Industry and Commerce, where he proposed three bills, including one advocating for the expansion of the textile industry. That same year, he purchased land in the western suburbs of Wuxi to develop the Plum Garden, constructed new roads, and led the reconstruction of the Miaoguang Pagoda in the Nanzen Temple.

Beginning in April 1915, the Rong brothers successively established Shenxin Textile Factories No. 1 to No. 9 in Shanghai, Wuxi, and Hankou. Rong Desheng managed Shenxin No. 3 Factory in Wuxi.

By 1931, the Rong brothers operated 12 flour mills and 9 cotton mills. They earned the titles "King of Flour" and "King of Cotton Yarn", becoming some of the most prominent industrialists in Republican China. During this time, Rong Desheng also served as a member of the second Jiangsu Provincial Assembly and the Beiyang Government.

=== Second Sino-Japanese War ===
During the Second Sino-Japanese War, Chinese businesses were often targeted by the pro-Japanese Wang Jingwei government. In 1937, five of Rong's seven textile mills in Shanghai were confiscated and handed over to Japanese firms. These were later offered back to their original owners as part of an effort to secure their support for the puppet regime. Rong Desheng, however, refused to cooperate with the Japanese, despite potential personal and financial benefits.

From 1938 onward, Rong assumed full leadership of the Rong family enterprise. He established six new factories in Chongqing, Chengdu, Baoji, Guangzhou, and other locations to support the war effort.

In November 1945, he founded Tianyuan Industrial Company in Wuxi, which oversaw the establishment of the Tianyuan Flax Textile Factory, the Open Source Machine Factory, and Jiangnan University.

=== Post Communist Revolution ===
In September 1949, Rong was elected to the first National Committee of the Chinese People's Political Consultative Conference. He was also appointed as a member of the Preparatory Committee of the All-China Federation of Industry and Commerce and the Consultative Committee of the People's Congresses representing various sectors in South Jiangsu.

Rong Desheng died on 29 July 1952 in Wuxi, Jiangsu Province.

== Personal anecdote ==
=== Philosophy and management style ===
Rong Desheng adhered to Confucian principles in both his personal life and business practices. He drew inspiration from the Confucian saying, "To establish oneself is to help others establish themselves; to achieve success is to help others succeed." He believed that sincerity, moral cultivation, and integrity, as described in The Doctrine of the Mean, were essential foundations for good governance and societal harmony.

Rong emphasised the importance of human capital in productivity, advocating for strong personnel management and the cultivation of capable staff. He stated that even if factory employees were not technical experts, management could still succeed if it operated with sincerity, discipline, virtue, and concern for the welfare of workers and their families. He maintained that "persuading people by virtue" was more effective than coercive leadership. His philosophy, according to contemporary accounts, had positive outcomes for enterprises like the Maoxin and Fuxin factories, though was considered less effective at the Shenxin factories.

This approach encouraged mutual trust between managers and workers, unified teams under a shared purpose, and improved productivity through simple but practical methods. His management style was seen as innovative for its time, especially in promoting cooperative labour relations and efficiency improvements.

=== Refusal to collaborate with the Japanese ===
During the winter of 1937, following the Japanese occupation of Shanghai and much of Jiangnan, many of Rong's enterprises were either bombed or seized. Only the factories located within the foreign concessions continued to operate.

In May 1938, Rong Desheng returned to Shanghai from Hankou and withdrew from public business activities. He spent his time collecting ancient books, calligraphy, and paintings while awaiting political stability.

In 1941, Japanese businessmen, through the Wang Jingwei collaborationist government, attempted to pressure Rong into selling his textile enterprises. Rong was approached regarding a proposed merger of Shenxin No. 1 and No. 8 factories with Japan's Toyota Yarn Company. He firmly rejected the proposal.

Subsequently, Wang's Foreign Minister, Chu Minyi, personally travelled to Shanghai and invited Rong for a meeting at the International Hotel. Rong sent his son Rong Yiren in his place, who conveyed that his father remained steadfast in refusing to cooperate or sell any part of his enterprise. Chu reportedly remarked, "Half of China already belongs to the Japanese. Why worry over two small Shenxin factories?" and issued a veiled threat: "Do not refuse to drink and still expect no punishment." In response, Rong Desheng is said to have declared resolutely: "I would rather die than surrender."

=== Book collection and cultural contributions ===
Rong Desheng made significant contributions to education and cultural preservation. In 1916, he established the Dagong Library (大公图书馆) in Huishan, Wuxi, and began acquiring a large number of books. He personally oversaw the library's operation and invited Qing-era scholar Yan Xiaolan to compile a comprehensive catalogue of the collection.

In 1921, the Catalogue of the Wuxi Private Dagong Library was published in twelve volumes, categorised into five sections: Classics, History, Philosophy, Literature, and Series. The collection grew to over 180,000 volumes before the outbreak of the Second Sino-Japanese War and included rare editions such as Yuan and Ming dynasty woodblock prints, the Complete Works from the Secret Cabinet of the Qing Dynasty, Gazetteer of Wuxi County, and the collected works of Fan Wenzheng.

Later in life, Rong maintained a private library in Shanghai known as Le Nong Jing She (樂農精舍). In his will, he donated more than 50,000 volumes to the Wuxi Library, which later published a catalogue of his donated collection. Additionally, thousands of cultural artefacts were donated to the Shanghai Museum.
