= Jiangnan University =

Public university in Wuxi, Jiangsu, China

- 江南大学
- Former names: Wuxi Institute of Light Industry (1958–1995); Wuxi University of Light Industry (1995–2001)
- Motto: 笃学尚行，止于至善
- Motto in English: Learning and Practice to Perfection
- Type: National
- Established: 1958; 68 years ago
- Chancellor: Zhu Qingbao
- President: Chen Wei
- Academic staff: 2,137
- Undergraduates: 20,612
- Postgraduates: 9,842
- Location: Wuxi, Jiangsu, China
- Campus: Lihu Campus (蠡湖校区) Yixin Campus (宜兴校区)
- Colours
- Website: jiangnan.edu.cn english.jiangnan.edu.cn

Chinese name
- Simplified Chinese: 江南大学
- Traditional Chinese: 江南大學
Transcriptions
Standard Mandarin
- Hanyu Pinyin: Jiāngnán Dàxué

Jiangnan University (江南大学) is a public university located in Wuxi, Jiangsu, China. It is affiliated with the Ministry of Education, and co-sponsored with the Jiangsu Provincial Government. The university is part of Project 211 and the Double First-Class Construction.

Previously known as the Wuxi University of Light Industry (无锡轻工大学), Jiangnan University emphasizes on light industry. biotechnology, chemical engineering, food science, mechanical engineering, textile engineering, fashion design, and industrial design.

== History ==
The private Jiangnan University (私立江南大学), one source of JiangnanU, was founded in Wuxi in 1947 by Rong Desheng, the largest national capitalist in the Republic of China era.

In 1952, during restructuring of higher education happened after the establishment of the People's Republic of China, the engineering related departments of Nanjing University (stretches back to San Jiang Normal School which founded in 1902 in Nanjing and later renamed National Central University), merging engineering departments of private Jiangnan University and several other engineering departments of universities in east China area, including Fudan University, Wuhan University, Zhejiang University, etc. Later, they formed Nanjing Institute of Technology, now Southeast University in Nanjing.

In 1958, the Department of Food Technology of Nanjing Institute of Technology moved to Wuxi and established Wuxi Institute of Light Industry (无锡轻工业学院) which was named Wuxi University of Light Industry in 1995.

In 2001, Jiangnan University (江南大学) was formed by the combination of Wuxi University of Light Industry (无锡轻工大学), Jiangnan College (江南学院) and Wuxi Education College (无锡教育学院).

== Campus ==
The newly completed university campus covers 208 hectares with floor space of 1.05 million square meters. It is located by Lake Li (蠡湖), an inner lake of Lake Tai and also a national scenic resort in the south of Wuxi. It was designed and built to demonstrate the concept of an "Eco-campus".

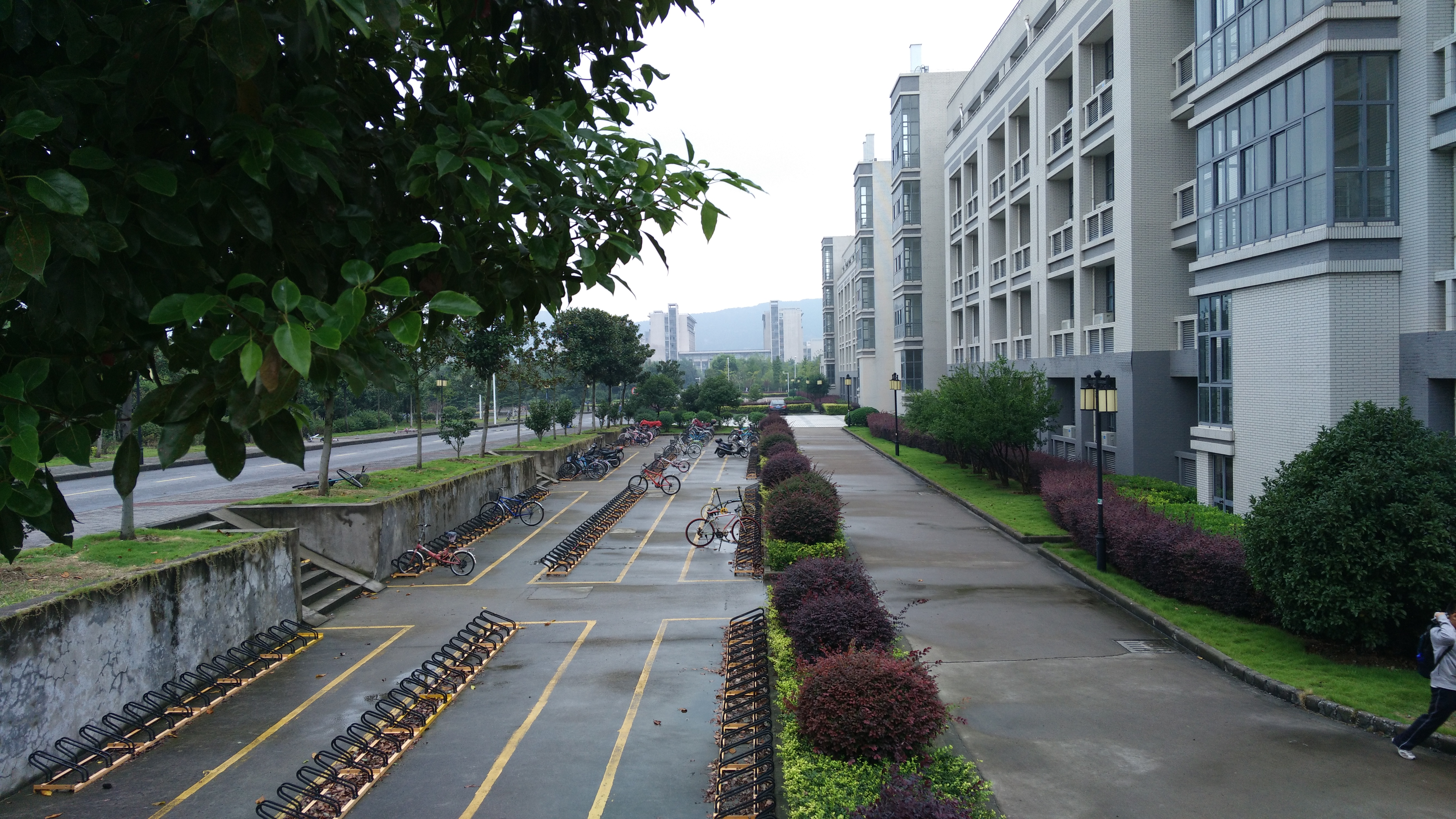
Lihu Campus

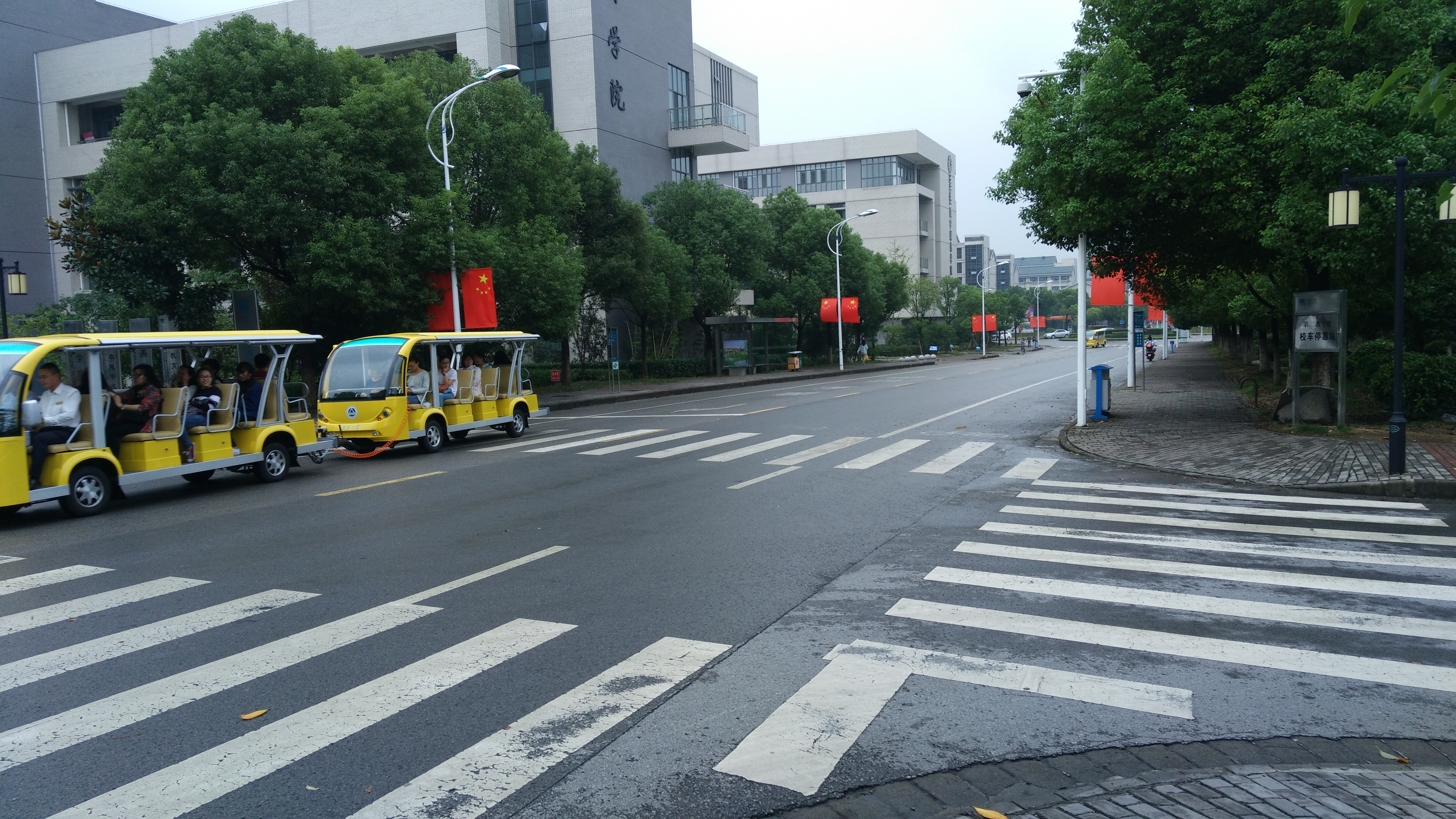
Lihu Campus

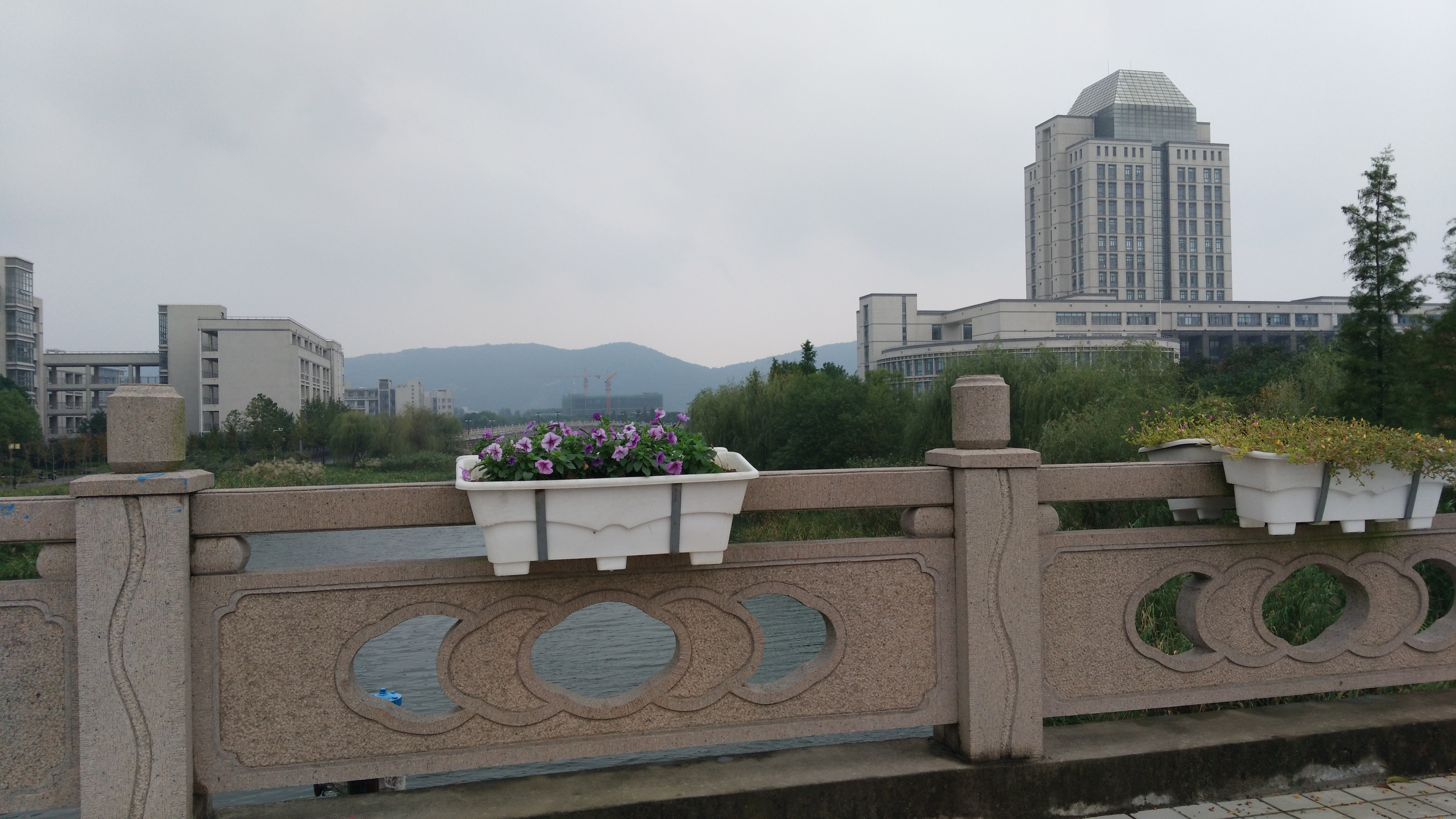
Lihu Campus

== Schools ==
Jiangnan University consists of 17 schools and offers 48 undergraduate programs with 9 disciplines including science, engineering, medicine, literature, economics, management, law, education and arts. Jiangnan University has 7 Post-doctoral Research Stations in the fields of Light Industry Technology and Engineering, Food Science and Technology, Chemical Engineering and Technology, Control Science and Engineering, Environment Engineering, Textile Engineering and Design. It is entitled to confer master's degrees in 58 programs, and doctoral degrees in 28 programs.

Southwest:

School of Food Science and Technology

School of Biotechnology

School of Chemical and Material Engineering

School of Pharmaceutical Sciences

Wuxi School of Medicine

Southeast:

School of Business

School of Law

School of Marxism

School of Foreign Studies

School of Artificial Intelligence and Computer Science

Northwest:

School of Textile and Clothing

School of Design

School of Internet of Things Engineering (incorporated by School of Communications and Control Engineering and School of Information Engineering)

School of Mechanical Engineering

School of Environmental and Civil Engineering

Northeast:

School of Science

School of Humanities and Education

Division of Sports

University rankings
The U.S. News rankings (2025)
Best Global Universities	376
Best Universities in Asia	93
Best Universities in China	53
National Discipline Assessment (2012)
Food Science and Engineering	1
Light Industry Technology and Engineering	2
Design Studies	4
Textile Science and Engineering	5

== Rankings and reputation ==
According to the 2024 Academic Ranking of World Universities, Jiangnan University ranked 301st-400th among world universities. The QS World University Rankings ranked Jiangnan University 851th globally and 275th in Asia in 2025.

Jiangnan University is regarded as one of the world's top "Food Science and Technology" research institutions. As of 2025, the "Food Science and Technology" program was ranked No.1 Globally by the Shanghai Ranking, and URAP ranking, the U.S. News Rankings, and the SCImago Institutions Rankings.

== Research ==
=== Key research institutes ===
- The National Key Lab of Food Science and Technology (食品科学与技术国家重点实验室)
- The National Engineering Laboratory for Cereal Fermentation Technology (粮食发酵工艺与技术国家工程实验室)
- The National Engineering Research Centre for Function Food (国家功能食品工程技术研究中心)
- Key Laboratory of Industrial Biotechnology, Ministry of Education (工业生物技术教育部重点实验室)
- Key Laboratory of Carbohydrate Chemistry and Biotechnology, Ministry of Education (糖化学与生物技术教育部重点实验室)
- Key Laboratory of Synthetic and Biological Colloids, Ministry of Education (合成与生物胶体教育部重点实验室)
- Key Laboratory of Science and Technology of Eco-Textile, Ministry of Education (生态纺织教育部重点实验室)

== Faculty ==
The university has 3393 faculty members, including 2137 full-time instructors. 63.8% of faculty holds a senior title, 68.9% has a doctoral degree, and 42.1% has more than one year of overseas experience.

The school has three academician of the Chinese Academy of Engineering, 14 "Thousand Talents Plan" awardees, 13 "Chang Jiang Scholars Program" distinguished professors, 5 National Science Fund for Distinguished Young Scholars awardees, five National Science Fund for Outstanding Scholars awardees, one "973 Program" chief scientist, eight "Ten Thousand Talent Program" awardees.

== International engagement ==
The university has signed cooperation and exchange agreements with 190 universities and research institutions in 39 countries and regions, and 28.6% of the students have overseas exchange and exchange experience; it has built the world's first Confucius Institute with the theme of Chinese food culture in cooperation with the University of California, Davis.

Jiangnan University began to accept international students from 1964, and has cultivated students from more than 80 countries. The university specially establishes "President Scholarship", "Taihu Scholarship" and "New Student Scholarship" for international students. In 2010, the university recruited 25 self-enroll Chinese Government Scholarship students.

Doctoral Program for international students mainly includes: Food Science, Fermentation Engineering, Pharmaceutical Engineering and Technology, Textile Science and Engineering, Control Science and Control Engineering, Chemistry Engineering and Technology, Environment Engineering, Light Industry Machinery and Packaging Engineering, Product Design Theory and Technology, etc.
