= Obangsaek =

Traditional Korean color spectrum

- The five cardinal colors of the traditional Korean color spectrum

Korean name
- Hangul: 오방색
- Hanja: 五方色
- RR: obangsaek
- MR: obangsaek

Obangsaek (Korean: 오방색; lit. 'five direction colors') is a traditional Korean color scheme and system of comprising white, black, blue, red and yellow. In Korean traditional arts and traditional textile patterns, the colors of obangsaek represent five cardinal directions. The five colors are also associated with the Five Elements in Korean culture.

In obangsaek, blue represents the East and the element of wood, red represents the South and the element of fire, yellow represents the center and the element of earth, white represents the West and the element of metal, and black represents the North and the element of water. Balance between the five colors was historically considered necessary for a healthy life, and the color scheme can be found in traditional Korean arts such as crafts, clothing, architecture, instruments, flags, and food.
