= Yuantouzhu =

Peninsula on Lake Tai, China

Coordinates: 31°31′4″N 120°13′40″E

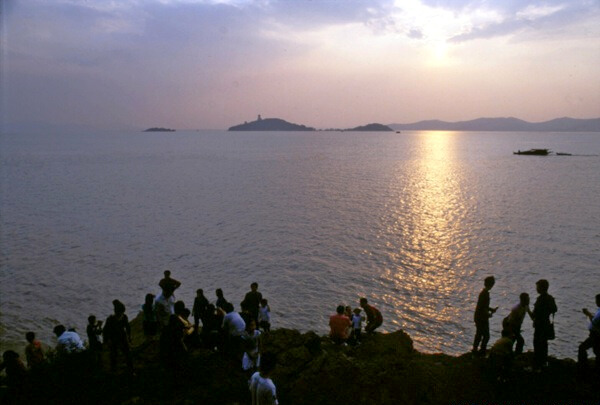
Yuantouzhu peninsula, Sanshan Islands and Lake Tai

Yuantouzhu (Chinese: 鼋头渚; pinyin: Yuán tóu zhǔ) is a peninsula which lies on the northwestern shore of Lake Tai, near Wuxi in China's Jiangsu province. It was established as a park in 1916 and celebrated its centennial in 2016.

Yuantouzhu, or "Turtle Head Isle" in English (so called because its shape resembles a turtle's head), is a popular scenic tourist region. Tourist ferries leave from Yuantouzhu to the Sanshan Islands (三山岛), which were opened to tourists in the mid-1980s. Seagulls follow the boat and like to be fed by tourists on the boat.

The Yuantouzhu park is famous for its tourism, especially during the spring season from March to April, when hundreds of cherry blossom trees start to bloom. Two gates are open for tourists which are Chongshan gate and Dushan main gate. During the season, there are also at least eight ancient fishing sailboats on the lake.

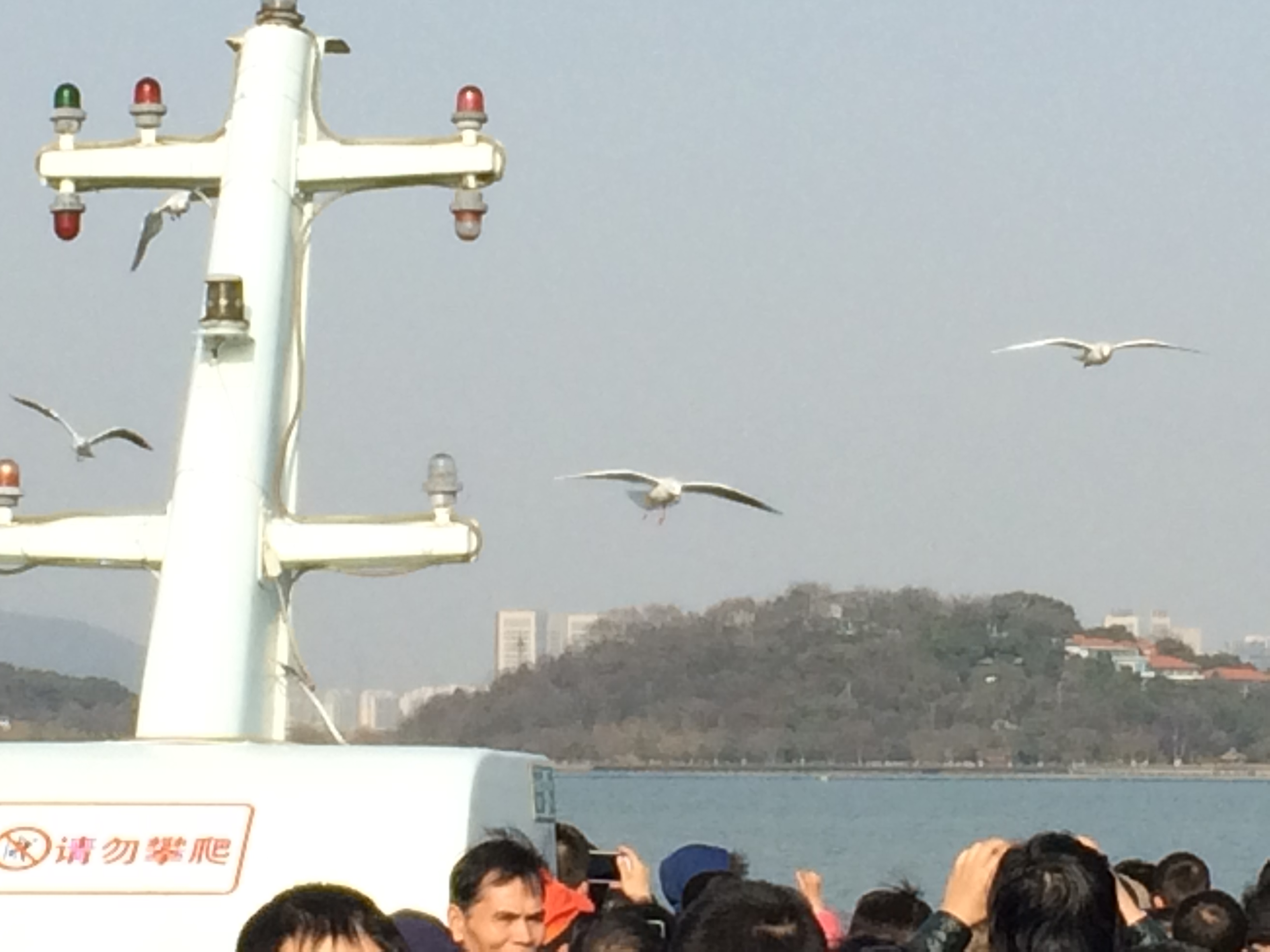
Seagulls following yuantouzhu boat

== Gallery ==
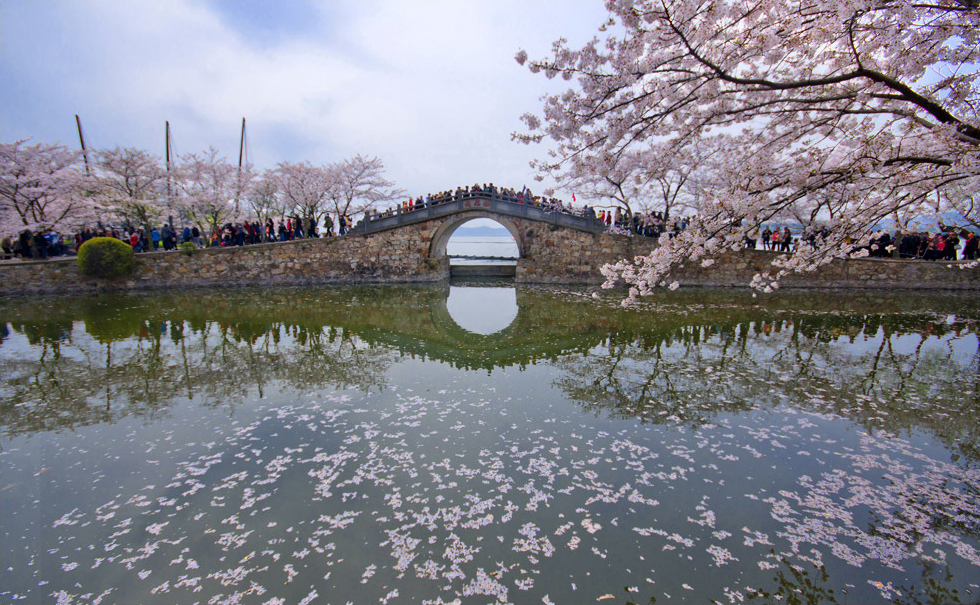
Wuxi Taihu Lake Changchun Bridge during cherry blossom blooming season (2009)

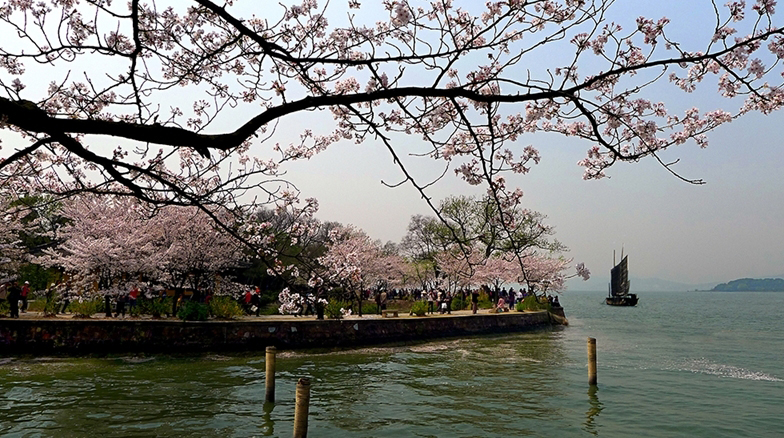
Wuxi Taihu Lake Changchun Bridge during cherry blossom blooming season (2012)

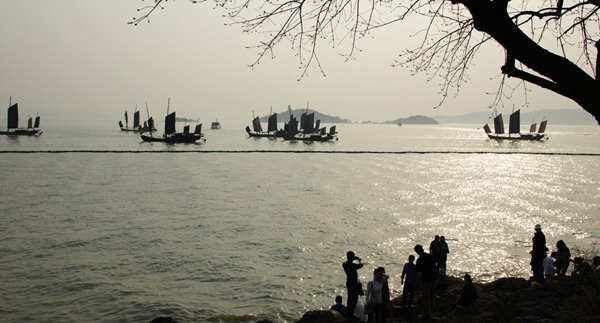
Wuxi Taihu Lake near Yuantouzhu with ancient fishing ships (2012)
