= Sanshan Islands, Wuxi =

Island group in Wuxi, China

Coordinates: 31°01′N 120°01′E

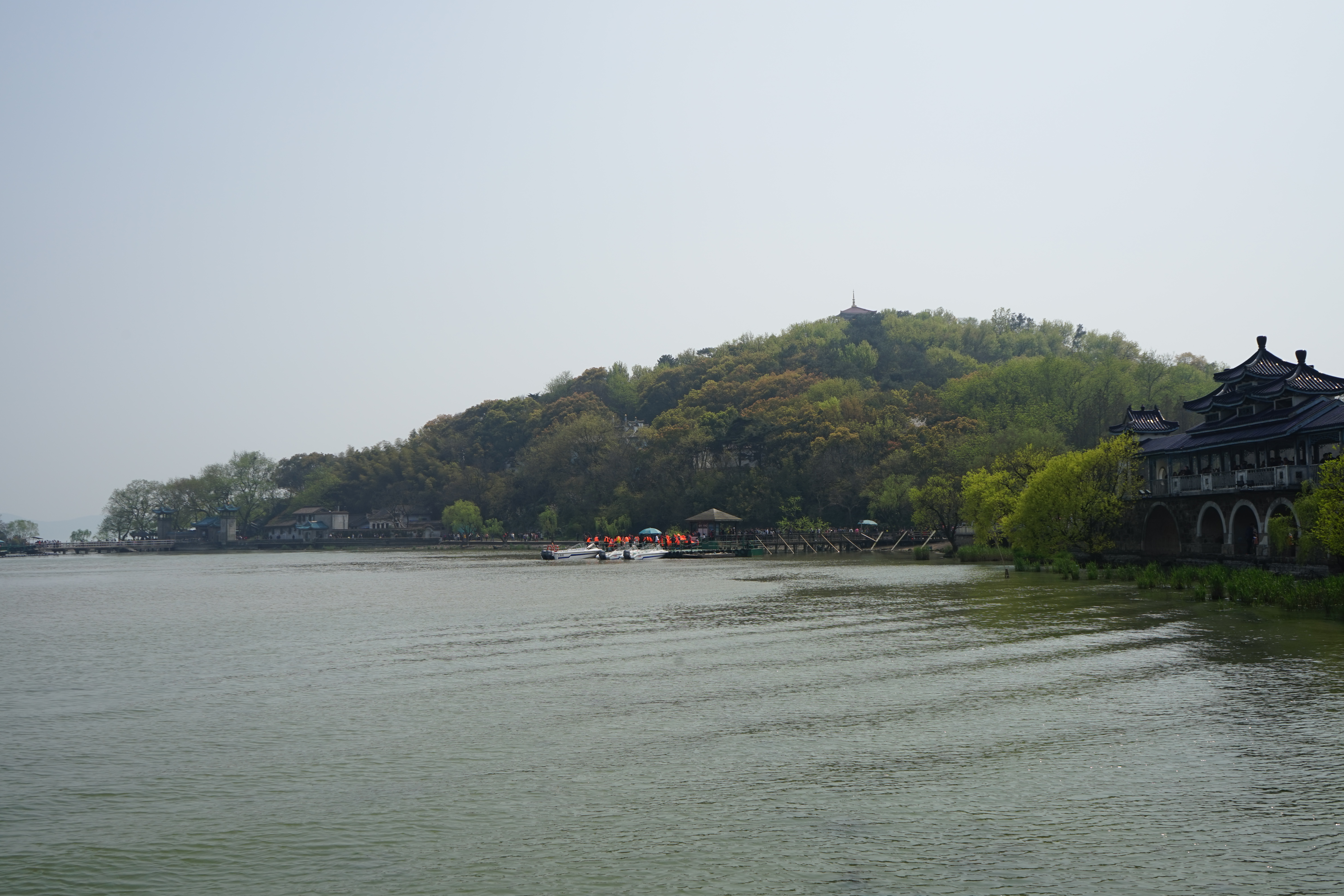
- Sanshan Islands
- Traditional Chinese: 三山島
- Simplified Chinese: 三山岛
- Literal meaning: Three Hilly Islands
Transcriptions
Standard Mandarin
- Hanyu Pinyin: Sānshān Dǎo
- Wade–Giles: San-shan Tao

The Sanshan Islands are an island group in Lake Tai administered as part of Wuxi Prefecture, Jiangsu Province, China.

The three islands were infamous as a hiding place for bandits. They are also known for their Buddhist temples and tall idols, the Lingshan Buddha on the Mashan Peninsula being 88 m (289 ft) high.
