= Wusheng Road station =

Metro station in Wuhan, China

Wusheng Road 武胜路
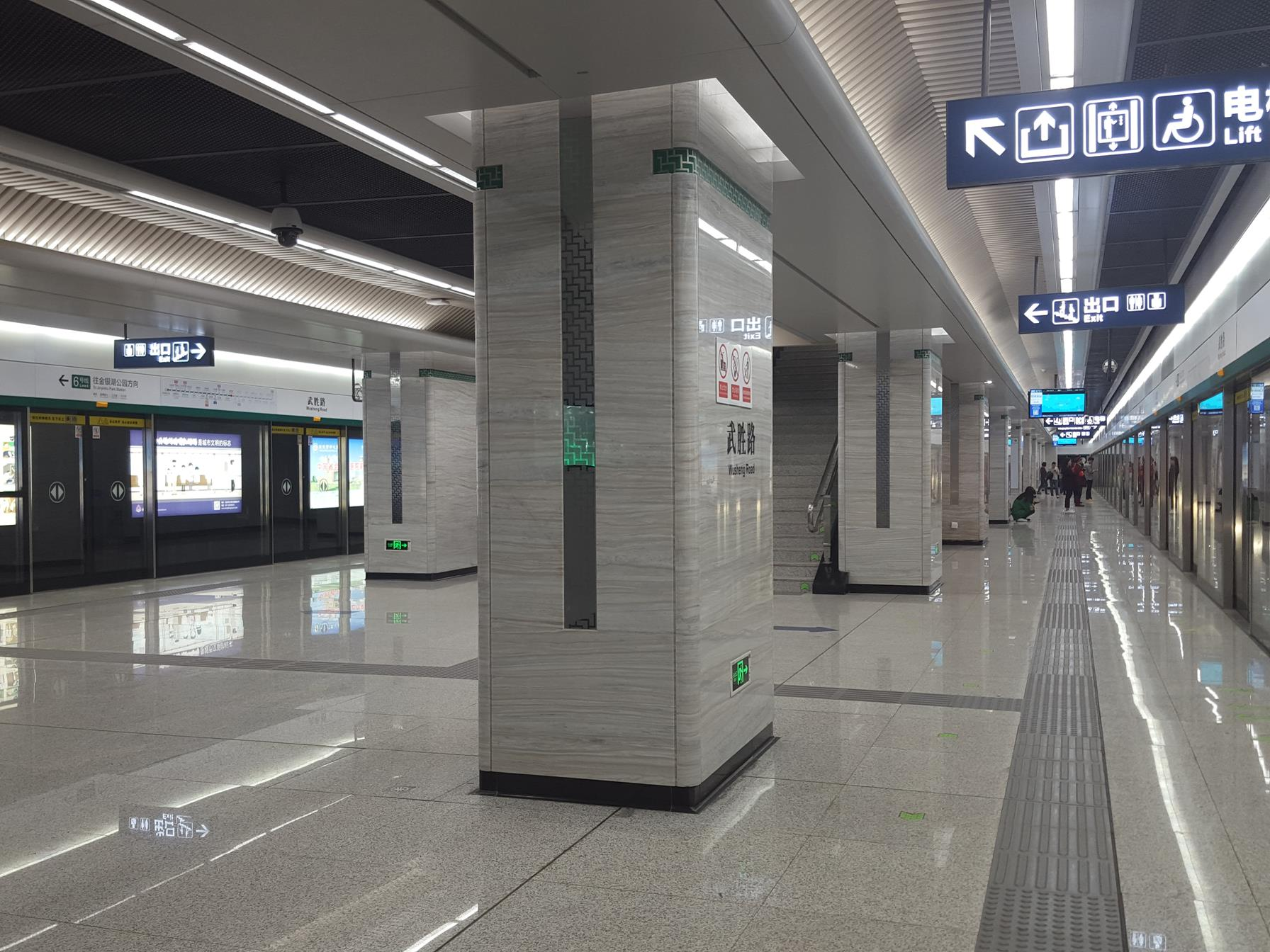

General information
- Location: Qiaokou District, Wuhan, Hubei; China
- Operated by: Wuhan Metro Co., Ltd
- Line: Line 6
- Platforms: 2 (1 island platform)

Construction
- Structure type: Underground

History
- Opened: December 28, 2016 (Line 6)

Services
Preceding station	Wuhan Metro	Following station
Hanzheng Street towards Xincheng 11th Road	Line 6	Qintai towards Dongfeng Motor Corporation
Location

Wusheng Road Station (Chinese: 武胜路站) is a station on Line 6 of the Wuhan Metro. It entered revenue service on December 28, 2016. It is located in Qiaokou District.

== Station layout ==
G	Entrances and Exits	Exits A-H, J-N, P, Q
B1		Corridor
B2	Concourse	Faregates, Station Agent
B3	Northbound	← Line 6 towards Xincheng 11th Road (Hanzheng Street)
B3	Island platform, doors will open on the left
B3	Southbound	Line 6 towards Dongfeng Motor Corporation (Qintai) →

== Gallery ==
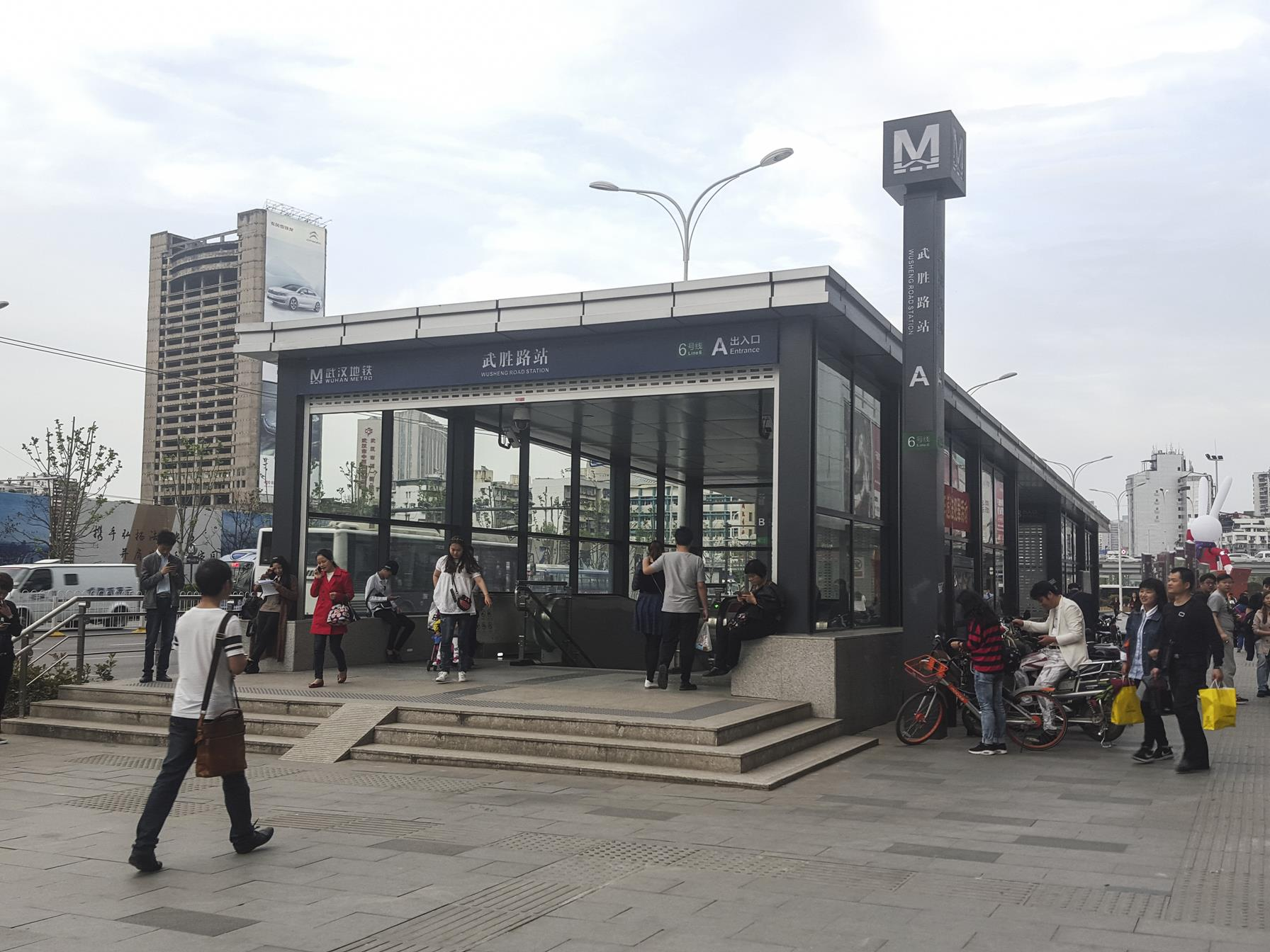
Entrance A

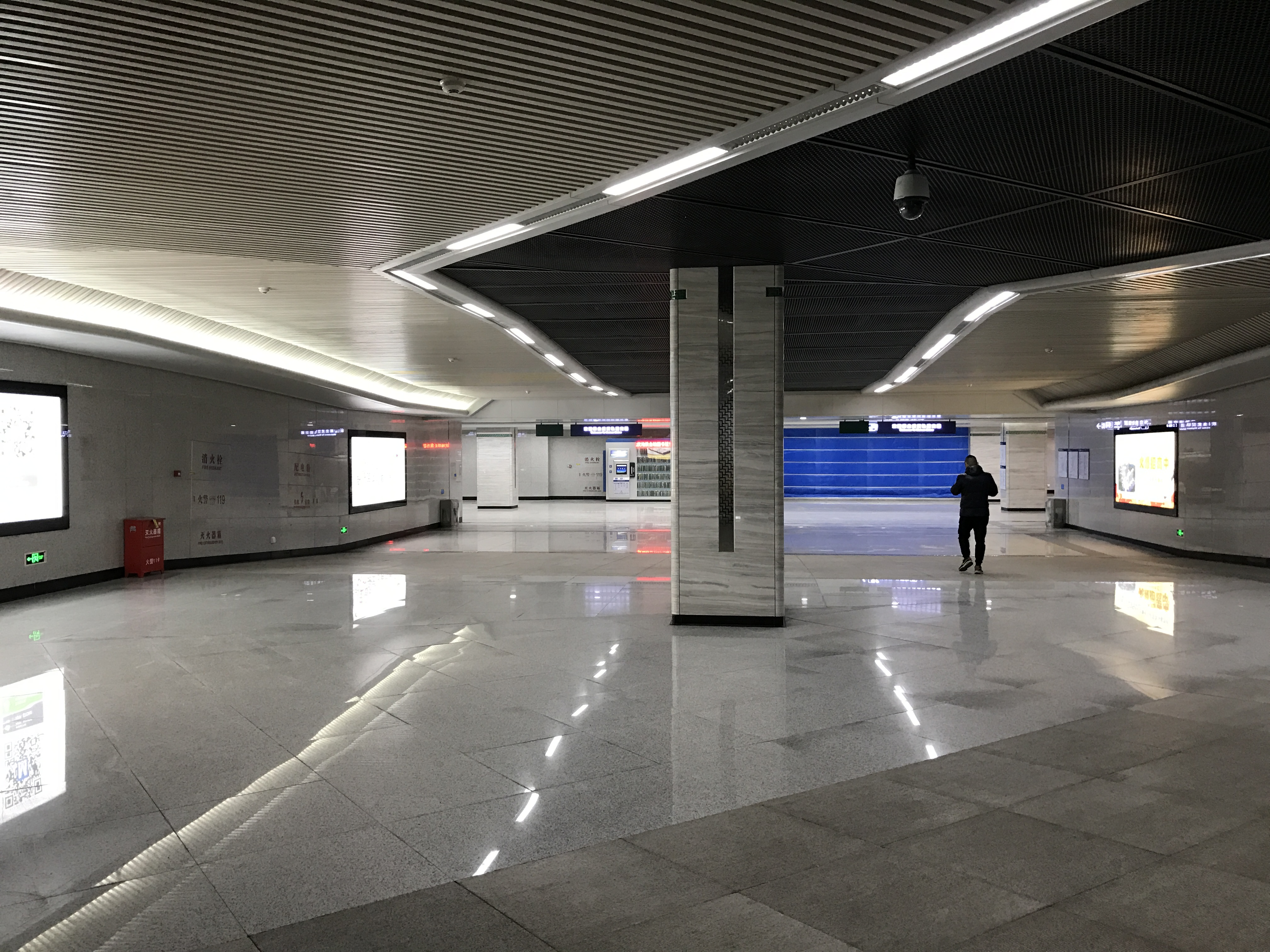
Corridor
