= Tangjiadun station =

Metro station in Wuhan, China

Tangjiadun 唐家墩 metro

General information
- Location: Jianghan District, Wuhan, Hubei; China
- Coordinates: 30.6201°N 114.2658°E
- Operated by: Wuhan Metro Co., Ltd
- Line: Line 6
- Platforms: 2 (1 island platform)

Construction
- Structure type: Underground

History
- Opened: December 28, 2016 (Line 6)

Services
Preceding station	Wuhan Metro	Following station
Shiqiao towards Xincheng 11th Road	Line 6	Sanyanqiao towards Dongfeng Motor Corporation
Location

Tangjiadun Station (Chinese: 唐家墩站) is a station on Line 6 of the Wuhan Metro. It entered revenue service on December 28, 2016. It is located in Jianghan District.

== Station layout ==
G	Entrances and Exits	Exits A-C
B1	Concourse	Faregates, Station Agent
B2	Northbound	← Line 6 towards Xincheng 11th Road (Shiqiao)
B2	Island platform, doors will open on the left
B2	Southbound	Line 6 towards Dongfeng Motor Corporation (Sanyanqiao) →
