= Shiqiao station =

Shiqiao station can refer to:

- Shiqiao station (Guangzhou Metro), a metro station in Guangzhou, China
- Shiqiao station (Wuhan Metro), a metro station in Wuhan, China
