= Zhongjiacun station =

Metro station in Wuhan, China

Zhongjiacun 钟家村 metro
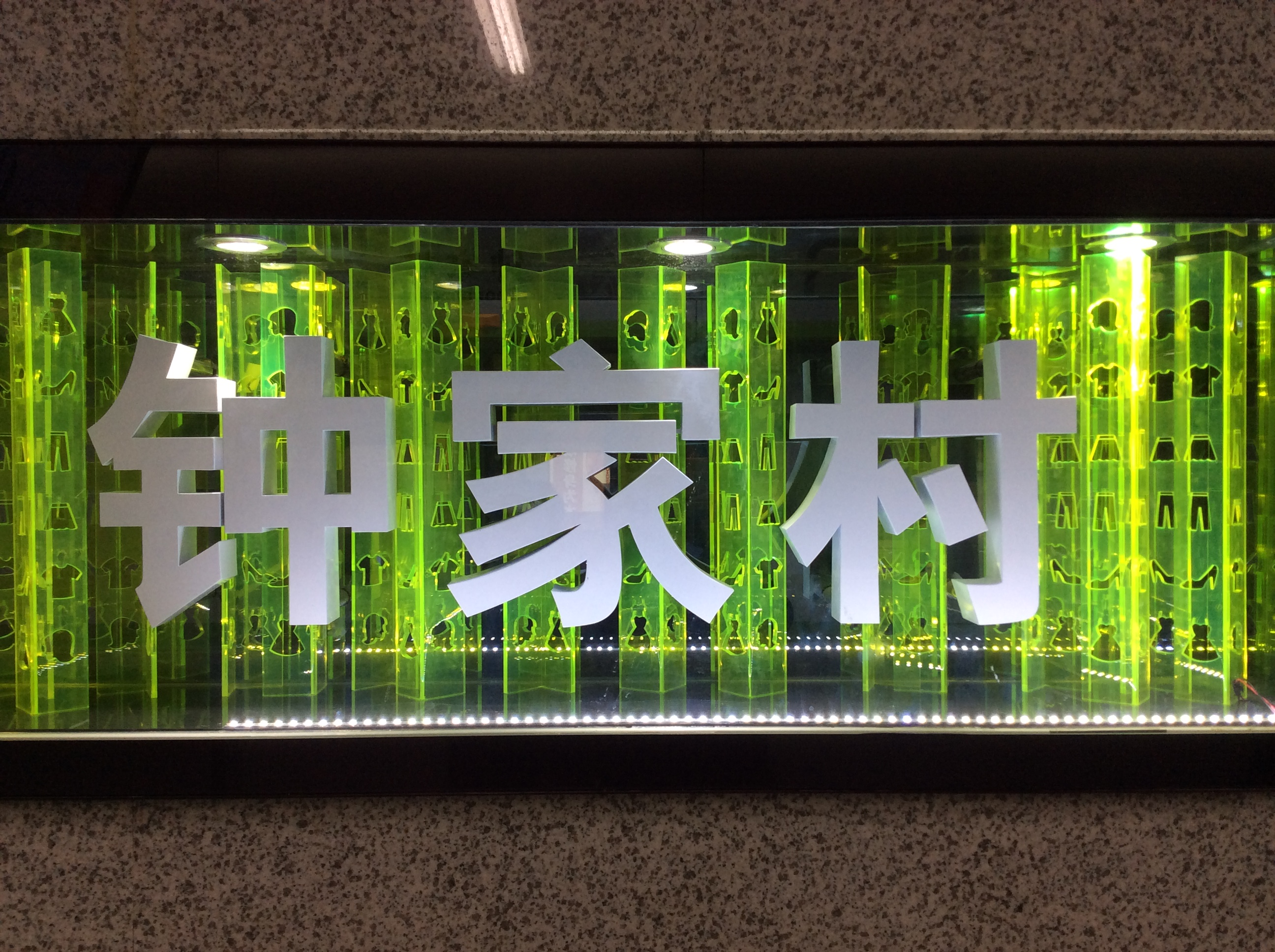

General information
- Location: Hanyang District, Wuhan, Hubei; China
- Coordinates: 30.551079°N 114.260707°E
- Operator: Wuhan Metro Co., Ltd
- Lines: Line 4; Line 6
- Platforms: 4 (2 island platforms)

Construction
- Structure type: Underground

History
- Opened: December 28, 2014 (Line 4); December 28, 2016 (Line 6)

Services
Preceding station	Wuhan Metro	Following station
Hanyang Railway Station towards Bailin	Line 4	Lanjiang Road towards Wuhan Railway Station
Qintai towards Xincheng 11th Road	Line 6	Maying Road towards Dongfeng Motor Corporation
Location

Zhongjiacun Station (Chinese: 钟家村站) is a transfer station on Line 4 and Line 6 of the Wuhan Metro. It entered revenue service on December 28, 2014. It is located between Hanyang Avenue (汉阳大道) and Yingwu Avenue (鹦鹉大道; literally "Parrot Avenue") in Hanyang District.

When Line 6 opened, it became the third station in the Wuhan Metro to allow cross-platform interchange.

== Station layout ==
G	Entrances and Exits	Exits A-E
B1	Concourse	Faregates, Station Agent
B2	Westbound	← Line 4 towards Bailin (Hanyang Railway Station)
B2	Island platform, doors will open on the left
B2	Southbound	Line 6 towards Dongfeng Motor Corporation (Maying Road)	→
B3	Northbound	← Line 6 towards Xincheng 11th Road (Qintai)
B3	Island platform, doors will open on the left
B3	Eastbound	Line 4 towards Wuhan Railway Station (Lanjiang Road) →

== Gallery ==
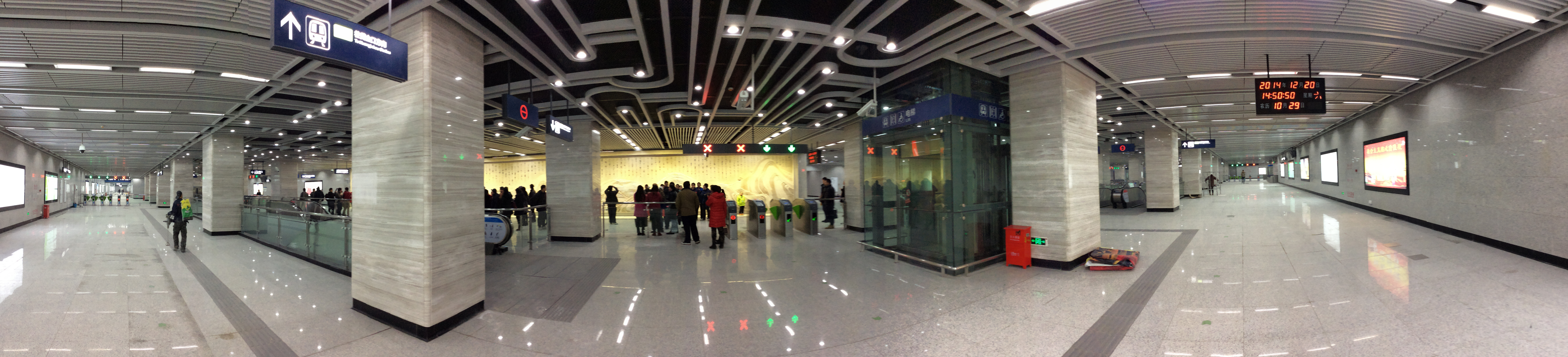
Concourse

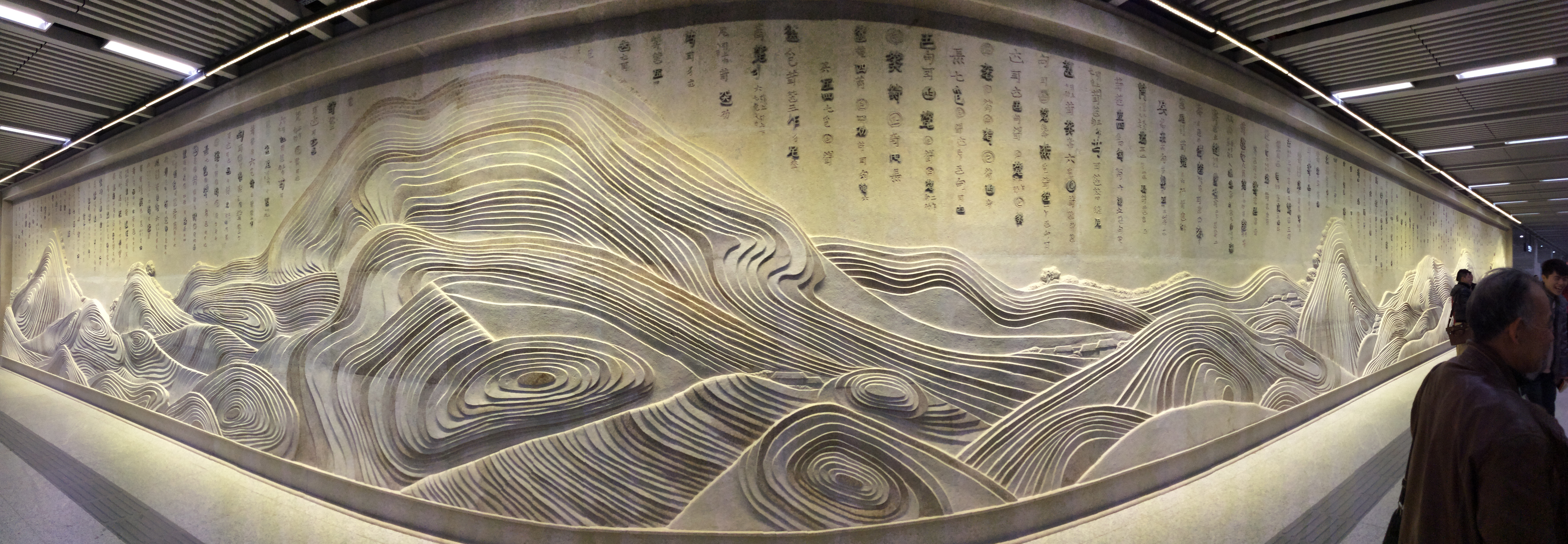
Art Wall

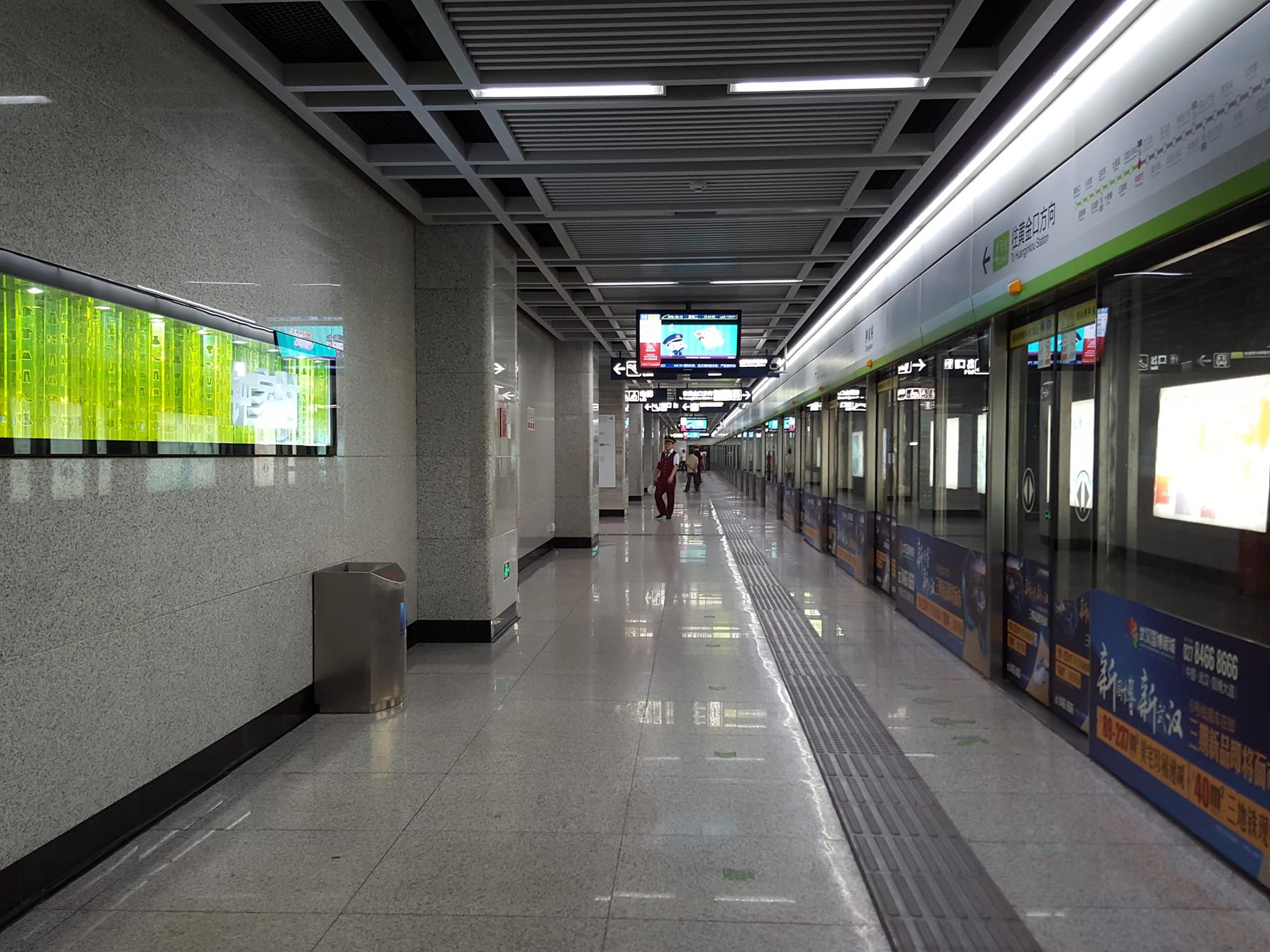
Line 4 platform

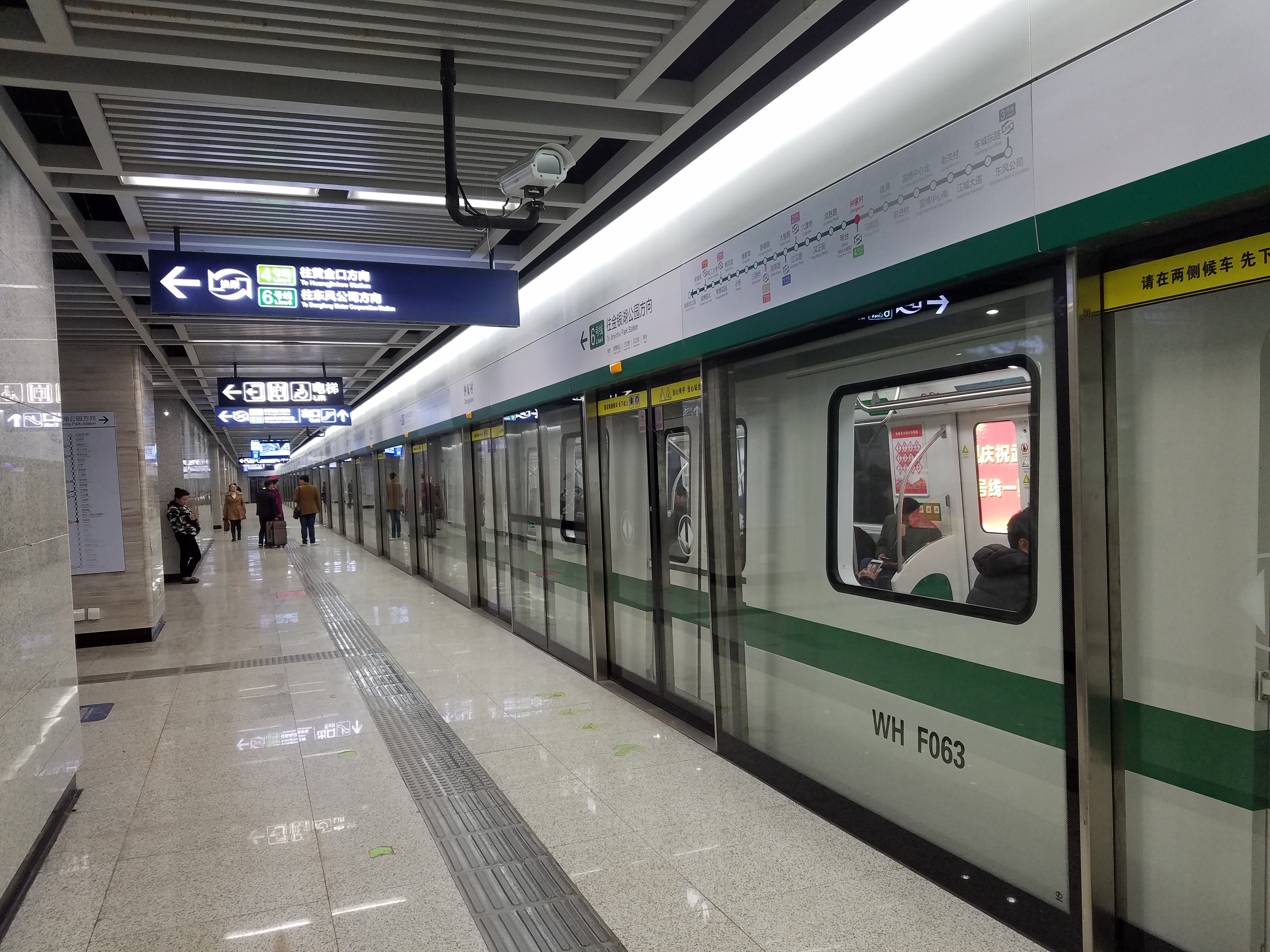
Line 6 platform
