= Changqing Huayuan station =

Wuhan Metro station

Changqing Huayuan 常青花园 metro
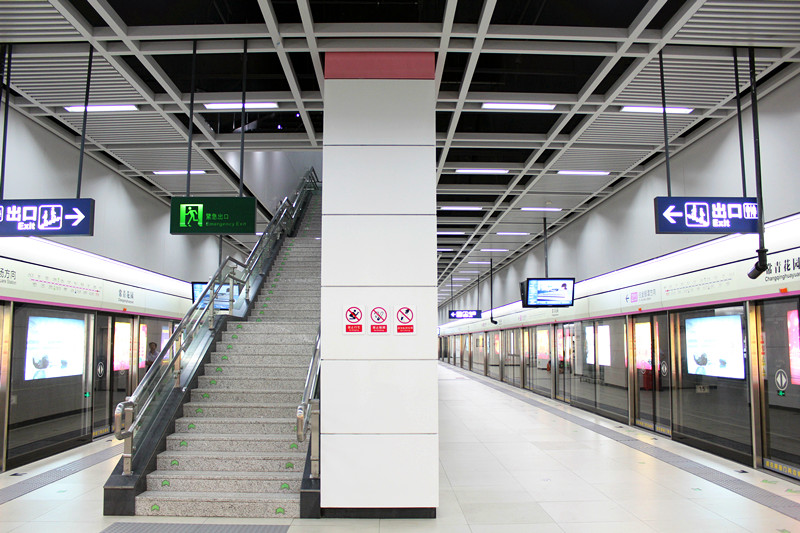
- Line 2 platform

General information
- Location: Dongxihu District, Wuhan, Hubei; China
- Coordinates: 30°38′37″N 114°14′15″E
- Operated by: Wuhan Metro Co., Ltd
- Lines: Line 2; Line 6
- Platforms: 4 (2 island platforms)

Construction
- Structure type: Underground

History
- Opened: December 28, 2012 (Line 2); December 28, 2016 (Line 6)

Services
Preceding station	Wuhan Metro	Following station
Jinyintan towards Tianhe International Airport	Line 2	Changgang Road towards Fozuling
Polytechnic University towards Xincheng 11th Road	Line 6	Yangchahu towards Dongfeng Motor Corporation
Location

Changqing Huayuan Station (Chinese: 常青花园站) is an interchange station of Line 2 and Line 6 of Wuhan Metro. It entered revenue service on December 28, 2012. It is located in Dongxihu District.

== Station layout ==
G	Concourse	Exits A-F
B1	Northbound	← Line 2 towards Tianhe International Airport (Jinyintan)
B1	Island platform, doors will open on the left
B1	Southbound	Line 2 towards Fozuling (Changgang Road) →
B2		Transfer passage
B3	Northbound	← Line 6 towards Xincheng 11th Road (Polytechnic University)
B3	Island platform, doors will open on the left
B3	Southbound	Line 6 towards Dongfeng Motor Corporation (Yangchahu) →

== Gallery ==
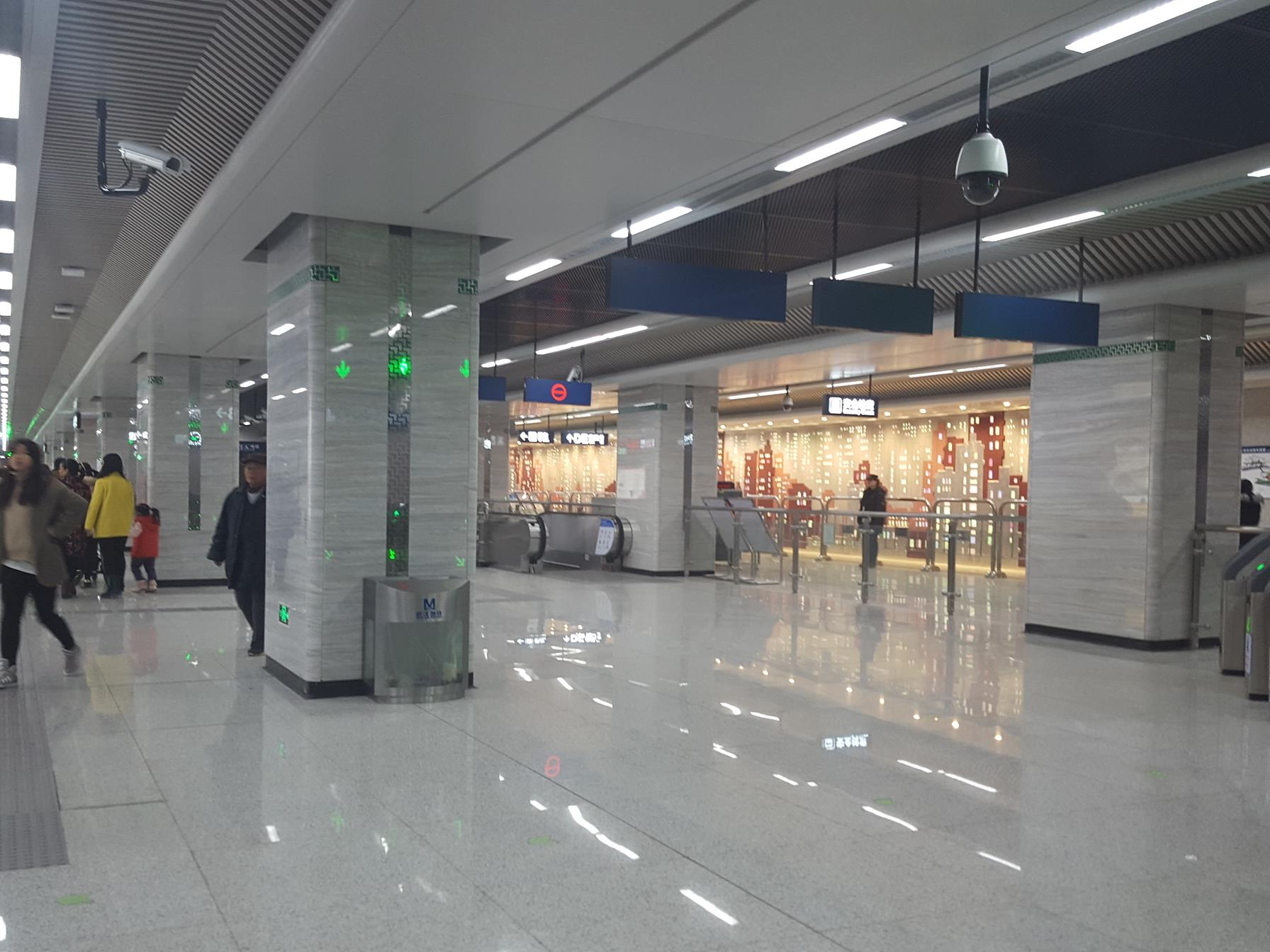
Concourse

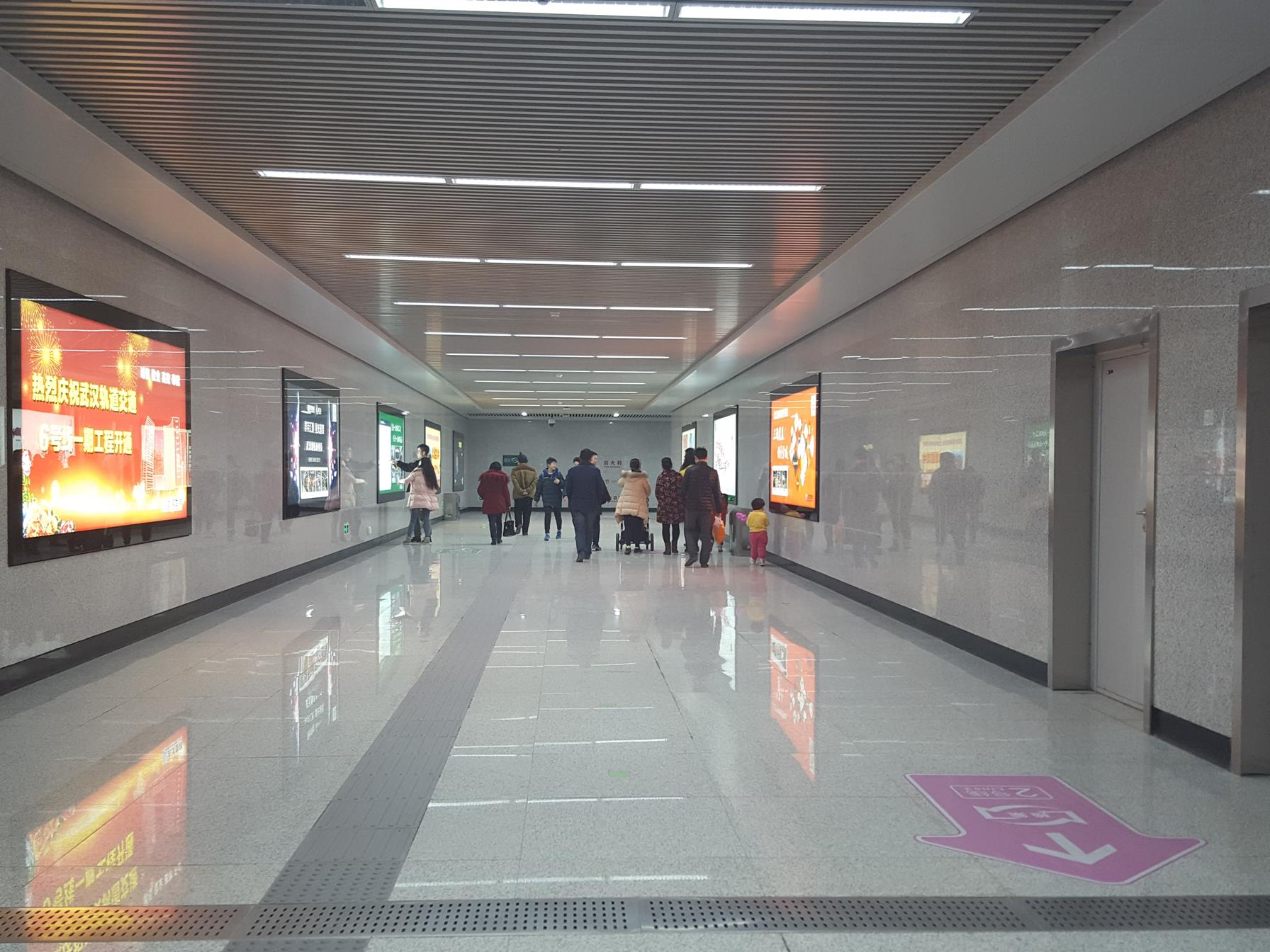
Transfer passage

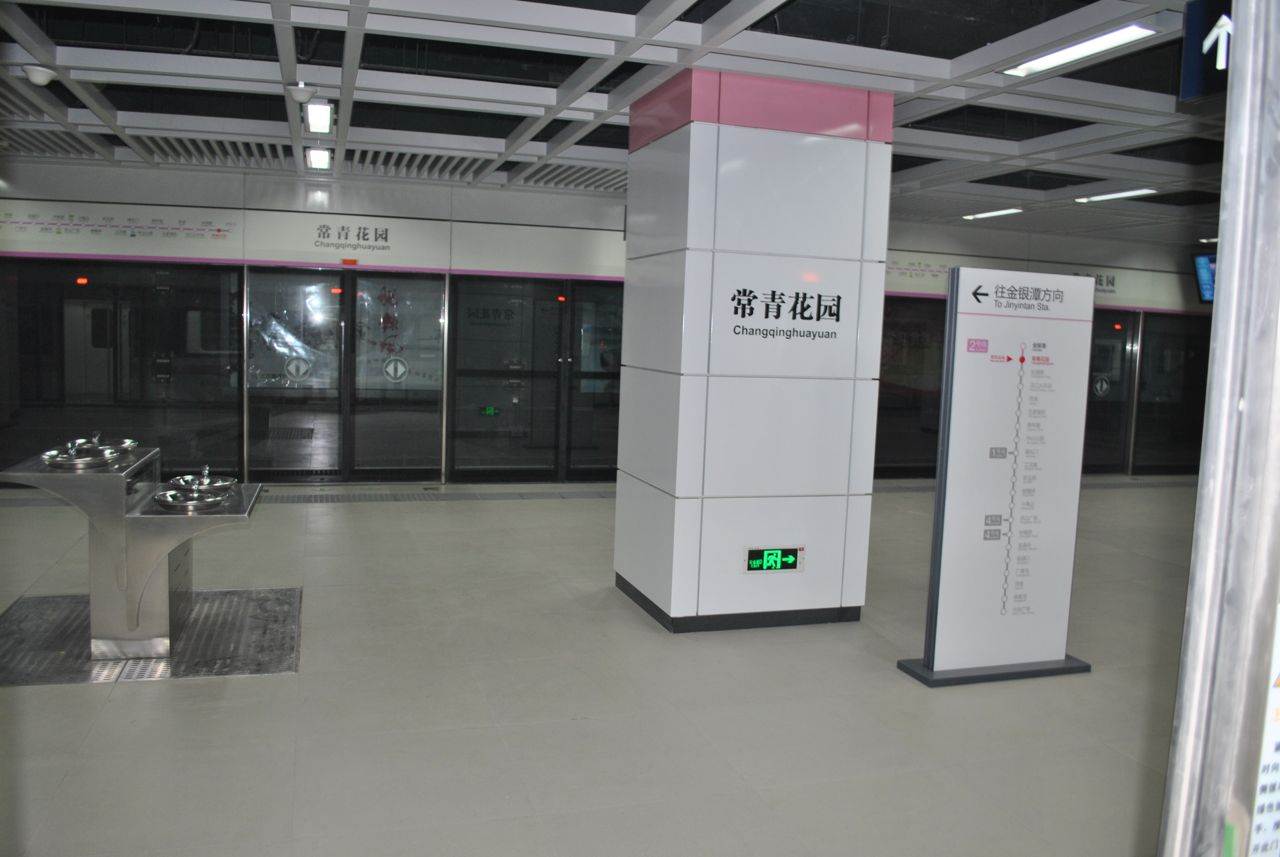
Line 2 platform

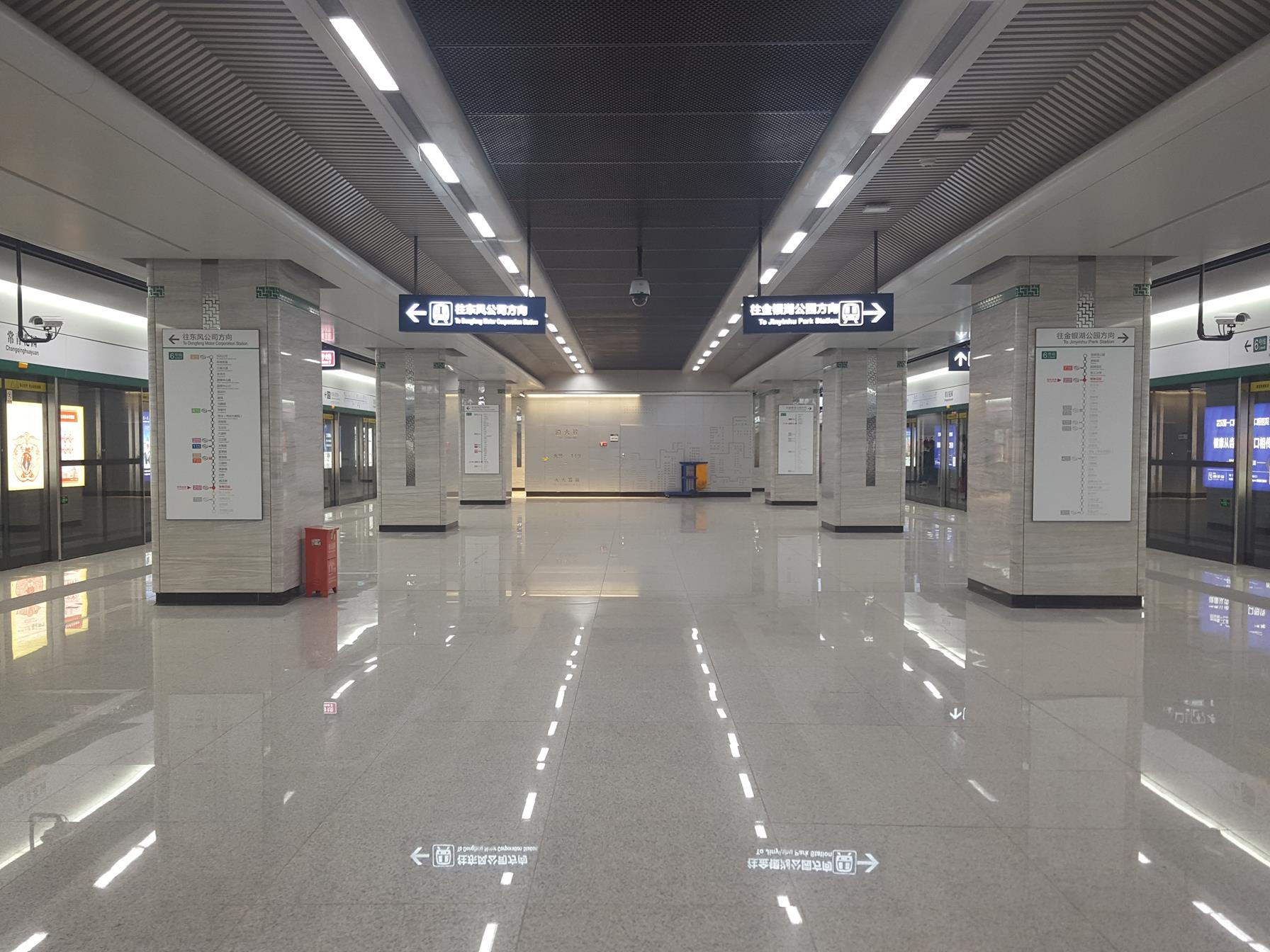
Line 6 platform
