= Changgang Road station =

Wuhan Metro station

Changgang Road 长港路 metro
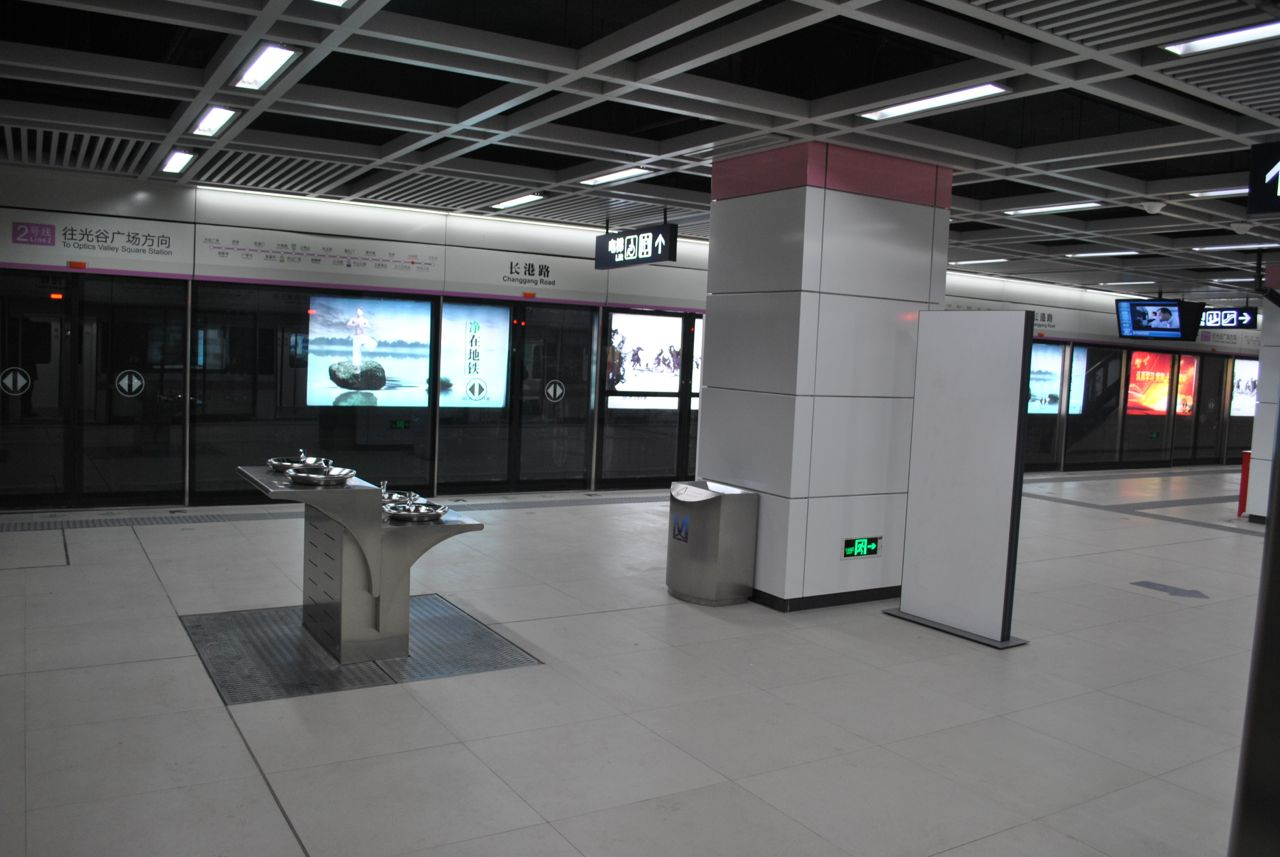

General information
- Location: Jianghan District, Wuhan, Hubei; China
- Coordinates: 30°37′46″N 114°14′26″E
- Operated by: Wuhan Metro Co., Ltd
- Line: Line 2
- Platforms: 2 (1 island platform)

Construction
- Structure type: Underground

History
- Opened: December 28, 2012 (Line 2)

Services
Preceding station	Wuhan Metro	Following station
Changqing Huayuan towards Tianhe International Airport	Line 2	Hankou Railway Station towards Fozuling
Location

Changgang Road Station (Chinese: 长港路站) is a station of Line 2 of Wuhan Metro. It entered revenue service on December 28, 2012. It is located in Jianghan District. The old name is Jinse Yayuan Station.

== Station layout ==
G	Entrances and Exits	Exits A-H, J
B1	Concourse	Faregates, Station Agent
B2	Northbound	← Line 2 towards Tianhe International Airport (Changqing Huayuan)
B2	Island platform, doors will open on the left
B2	Southbound	Line 2 towards Fozuling (Hankou Railway Station) →
