= Shiqiao station (Wuhan Metro) =

Metro station in Wuhan, China

Coordinates: 30.6317°N 114.2608°E

Shiqiao 石桥 metro

General information
- Location: Jianghan District, Wuhan, Hubei; China
- Operator: Wuhan Metro Co., Ltd
- Lines: Line 6 Line 12
- Platforms: 4 (2 island platforms)

Construction
- Structure type: Underground

History
- Opened: December 28, 2016 (Line 6); October 29, 2026 (Line 12)

Services
Preceding station	Wuhan Metro	Following station
Yangchahu towards Xincheng 11th Road	Line 6	Tangjiadun towards Dongfeng Motor Corporation
North Square of Hankou Railway Station Outer Circle	Line 12	Zhongyi Road Inner Circle
Location

Shiqiao Station (Chinese: 石桥站) is a station on Line 6 and Line 12 of the Wuhan Metro. It entered revenue service on December 28, 2016. It is located in Jianghan District.

== Station layout ==
G	Entrances and Exits	Exits A-F
B1	Concourse	Faregates, Station Agent
B2	Northbound	← Line 6 towards Xincheng 11th Road (Yangchahu)
B2	Island platform, doors will open on the left
B2	Southbound	Line 6 towards Dongfeng Motor Corporation (Tangjiadun) →
B3	Outer Circle	← Line 12 Outer Circle (North Square of Hankou Railway Station)
B3	Island platform, doors will open on the left
B3	Inner Circle	Line 12 Inner Circle (Zhongyi Road) →
