= Line 6 (Wuhan Metro) =

Line of Wuhan Metro

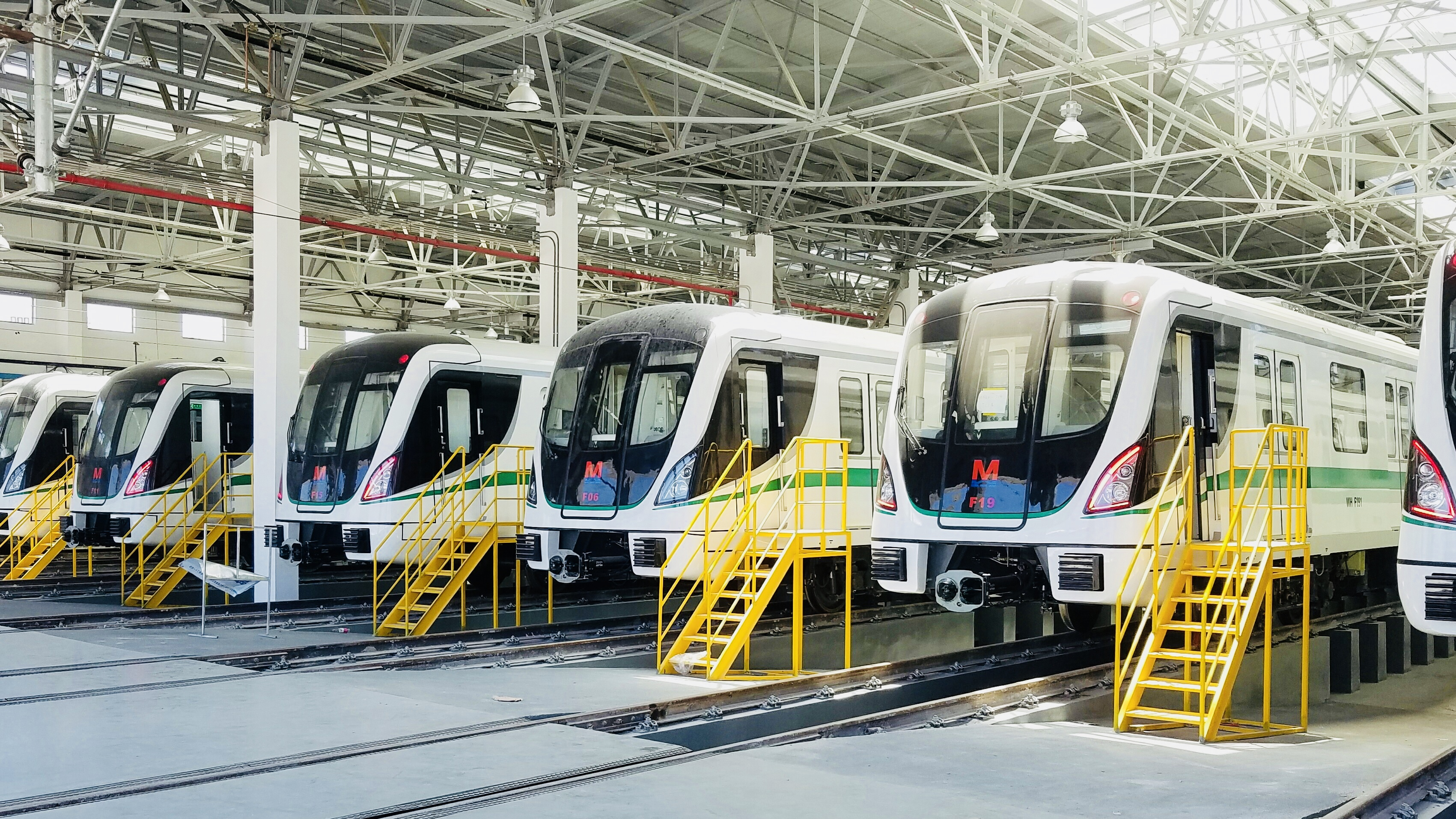

Overview
- Status: Operational
- Owner: Wuhan
- Locale: Wuhan, Hubei
- Termini: Xincheng 11th Road; Dongfeng Motor Corporation
- Stations: 32

Service
- Type: Rapid transit
- System: Wuhan Metro
- Services: 1
- Operator: Wuhan Metro Group Co., Ltd.
- Rolling stock: CRRC Zhuzhou Locomotive Chinese Type A

History
- Opened: 28 December 2016; 9 years ago

Technical
- Line length: 42.537 km (26.43 mi)
- Num of tracks: 2
- Character: Underground
- Track gauge: 1,435 mm (4 ft 8 1/2 in)
- Electrification: Overhead line, 1,500 V DC
Route map

Line 6 of the Wuhan Metro was opened on 28 December 2016. It is the fifth line to be opened in the system. A 7-km extension to the line opened on 26 December 2021.

The northern end of the line is Xincheng 11th Road station in Dongxihu District. The southern end of the line is Dongfeng Motor Corporation station in Caidian District.

Line 6 is the first Wuhan Metro line to utilize overhead catenary instead of third rail for electrification.

== History ==
Segment	Commencement	Length	Station(s)	Name
Jinyinhu Park — Dongfeng Motor Corporation	28 December 2016	35.512 km (22.07 mi)	27	Phase 1
Jinyinhu Park — Xincheng 11th Road	26 December 2021	7.025 km (4.37 mi)	5	Phase 2

== Stations ==
Station name		Connections	Distance km		Location
English	Chinese	Connections	Distance km		Location
Xincheng 11th Road	新城十一路				Dongxihu
Matoutan Park	码头潭公园	1			Dongxihu
Five Rings Sports Center	五环体育中心				Dongxihu
Erya Road	二雅路				Dongxihu
Haikou 3rd Road	海口三路				Dongxihu
Jinyinhu Park	金银湖公园		0.000	0.000	Dongxihu
Jinyinhu	金银湖		2.391	2.391	Dongxihu
Garden Expo North	园博园北	7	1.748	4.139	Dongxihu
Polytechnic University	轻工大学		1.202	5.341	Dongxihu
Changqing Huayuan	常青花园	2	0.961	6.302	Dongxihu
Yangchahu	杨汊湖		2.110	8.412	Jianghan
Shiqiao	石桥	12	0.844	9.256	Jianghan
Tangjiadun	唐家墩		1.477	10.733	Jianghan
Sanyanqiao	三眼桥		0.953	11.686	Jianghan
Xianggang Road	香港路	3 7	1.024	12.710	Jianghan / Jiang'an
Miaoli Road	苗栗路		0.864	13.574	Jiang'an
Dazhi Road	大智路	1	0.804	14.378	Jiang'an
Jianghan Road	江汉路	2	1.553	15.931	Jianghan
Liuduqiao	六渡桥		0.851	16.782	Jianghan
Hanzheng Street	汉正街		0.977	17.759	Qiaokou
Wusheng Road	武胜路		0.762	18.521	Qiaokou
Qintai	琴台		1.857	20.378	Hanyang
Zhongjiacun	钟家村	4	0.933	21.311	Hanyang
Maying Road	马鹦路		1.282	22.593	Hanyang
Jiangang	建港		1.478	24.071	Hanyang
Qianjincun	前进村		0.953	25.024	Hanyang
North International Expo Center	国博中心北		1.525	26.549	Hanyang
South International Expo Center	国博中心南	12 16	0.756	27.305	Hanyang
Laoguancun	老关村	16	1.826	29.131	Hanyang
Jiangcheng Boulevard	江城大道		2.805	31.936	Caidian
Checheng East Road	车城东路		2.279	34.215	Caidian
Dongfeng Motor Corporation	东风公司	3	1.297	35.512	Caidian

== Rolling Stock ==
Type	Time of manufacturing	Lines operated	Cars	Assembly	Notes
Type A		Line 6	40 train sets		Manufactured by CRRC Zhuzhou Locomotive. First 16 6-car train sets delivered in 2016.
