= Dongfeng Motor Corporation station =

Metro station in Wuhan, China

Dongfeng Motor Corporation 东风公司
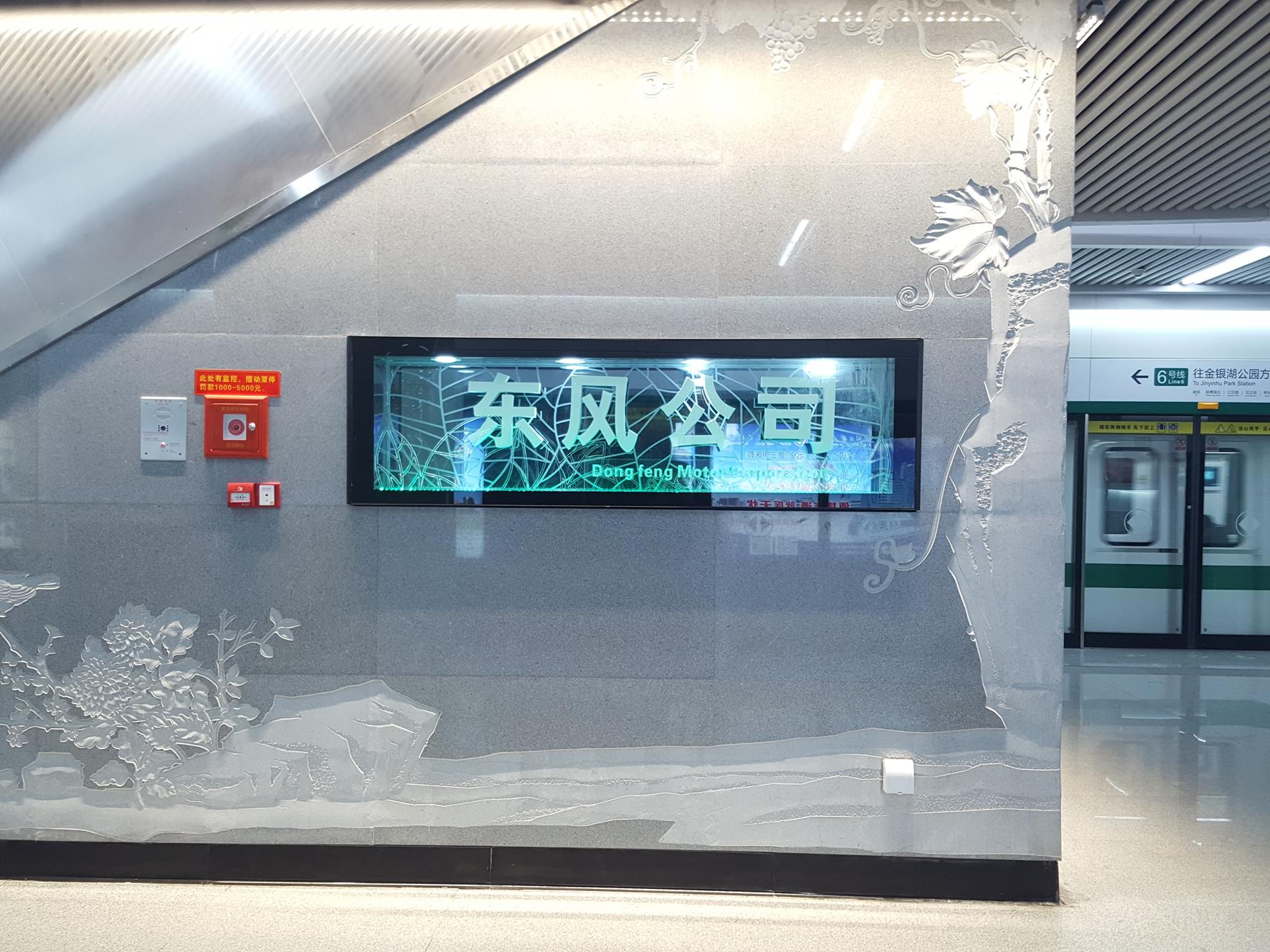
- Line 6 platform

General information
- Location: Caidian District, Wuhan, Hubei; China
- Operator: Wuhan Metro Co., Ltd
- Lines: Line 3 Line 6
- Platforms: 4 (2 island platforms)

Construction
- Structure type: Underground

History
- Opened: December 28, 2015 (Line 3); December 28, 2016 (Line 6)

Services
Preceding station	Wuhan Metro	Following station
Sports Center towards Hongtu Boulevard	Line 3	Zhuanyang Boulevard Terminus
Checheng East Road towards Xincheng 11th Road	Line 6	Terminus
Location

Dongfeng Motor Corporation Station (Chinese: 东风公司站) is a transfer station on Line 3 and Line 6 of the Wuhan Metro. It entered revenue service on December 28, 2015. It is located in Caidian District and it serves the Wuhan Stadium and the main headquarters of the Dongfeng Motor Corporation.

== Station layout ==
G	Entrances and Exits	Exits A-H, J
B1	Concourse	Faregates, Station Agent
B2	Northbound	← Line 6 towards Xincheng 11th Road (Checheng East Road)
B2	Island platform, doors will open on the left
B2	Southbound	Line 6 termination platform →
B3	Northbound	← Line 3 towards Hongtu Boulevard (Sports Center)
B3	Island platform, doors will open on the left
B3	Southbound	Line 3 towards Zhuanyang Boulevard (Terminus) →

== Gallery ==
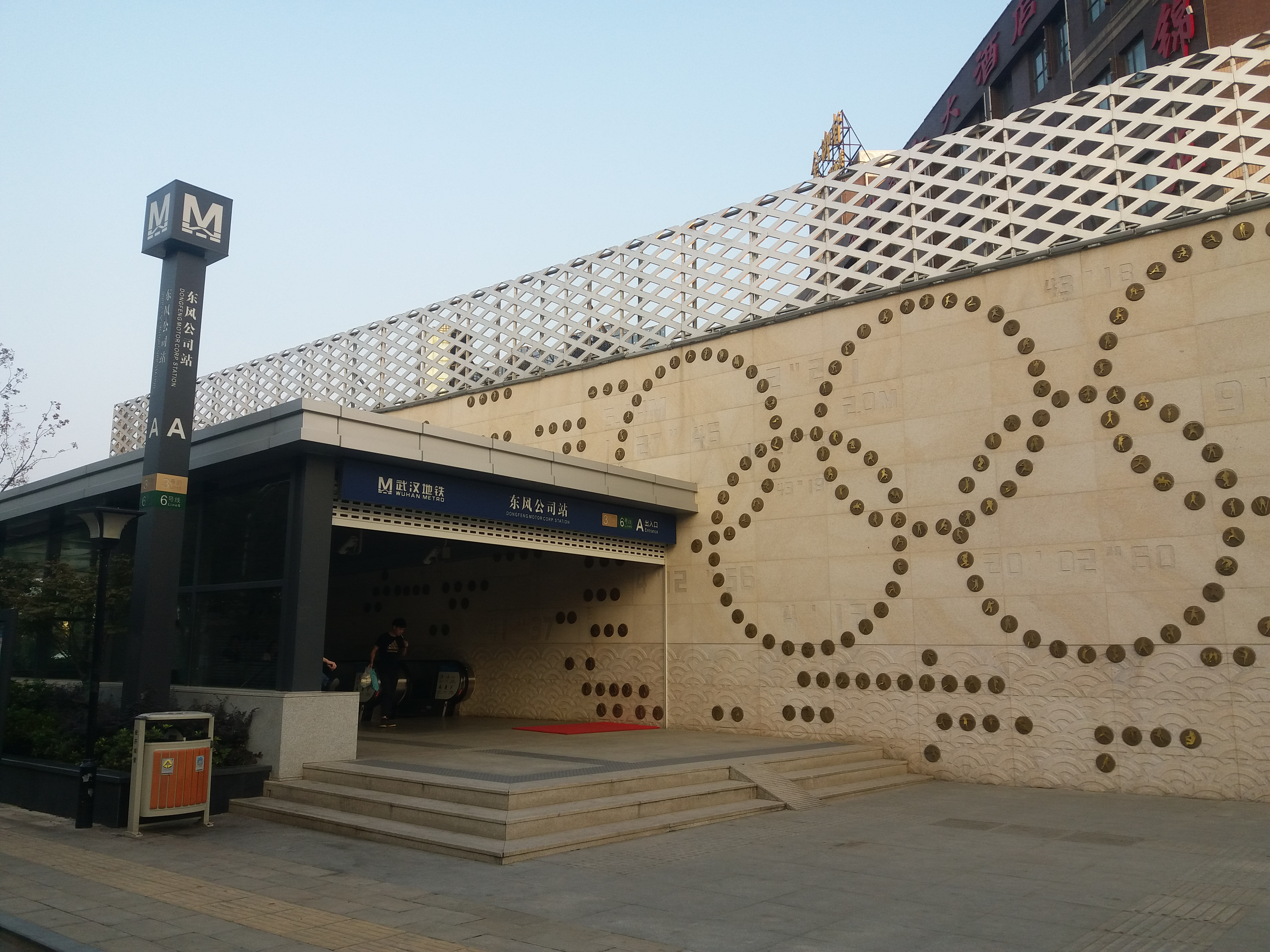
Entrance A

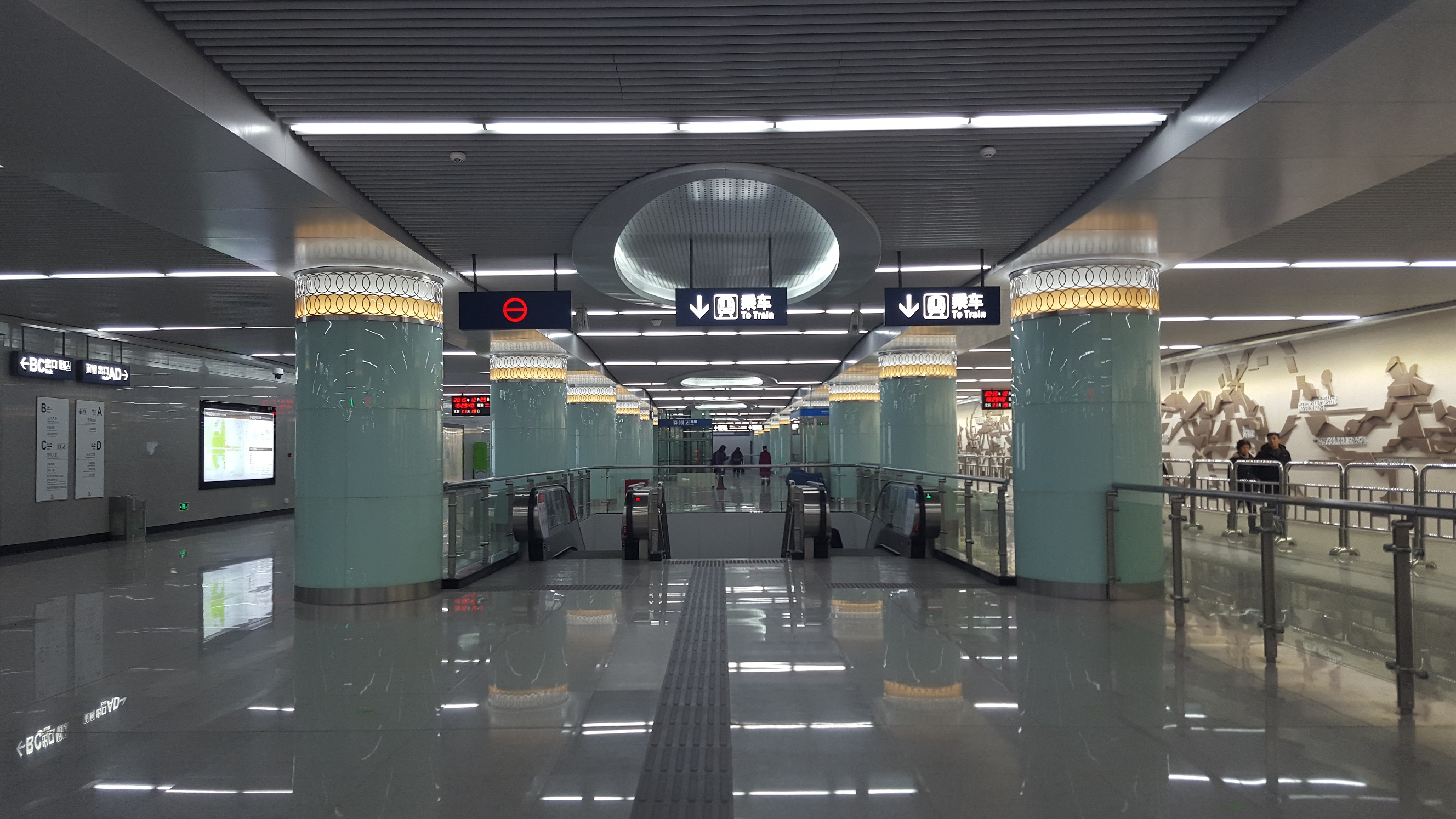
Concourse

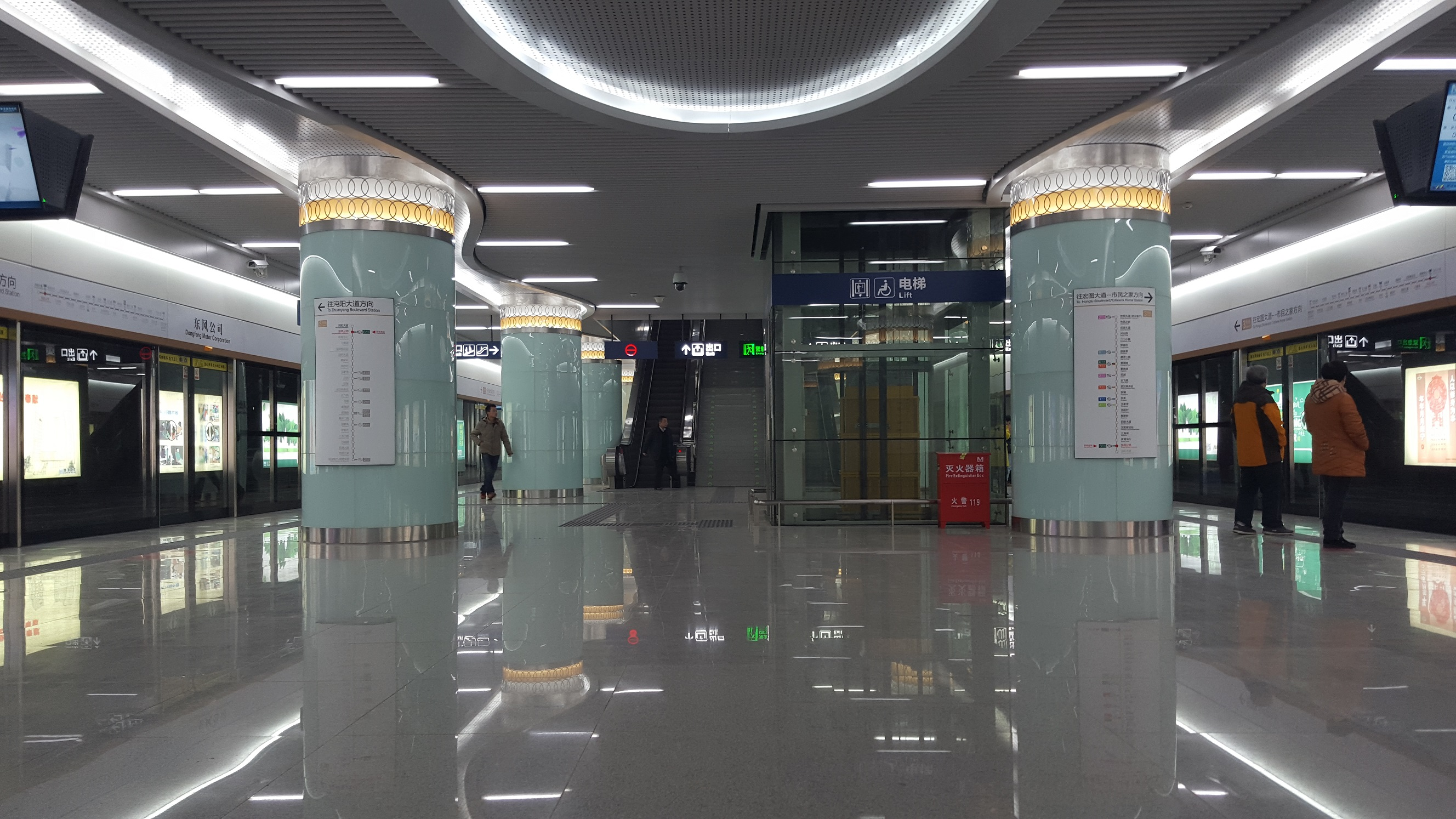
Line 3 platform

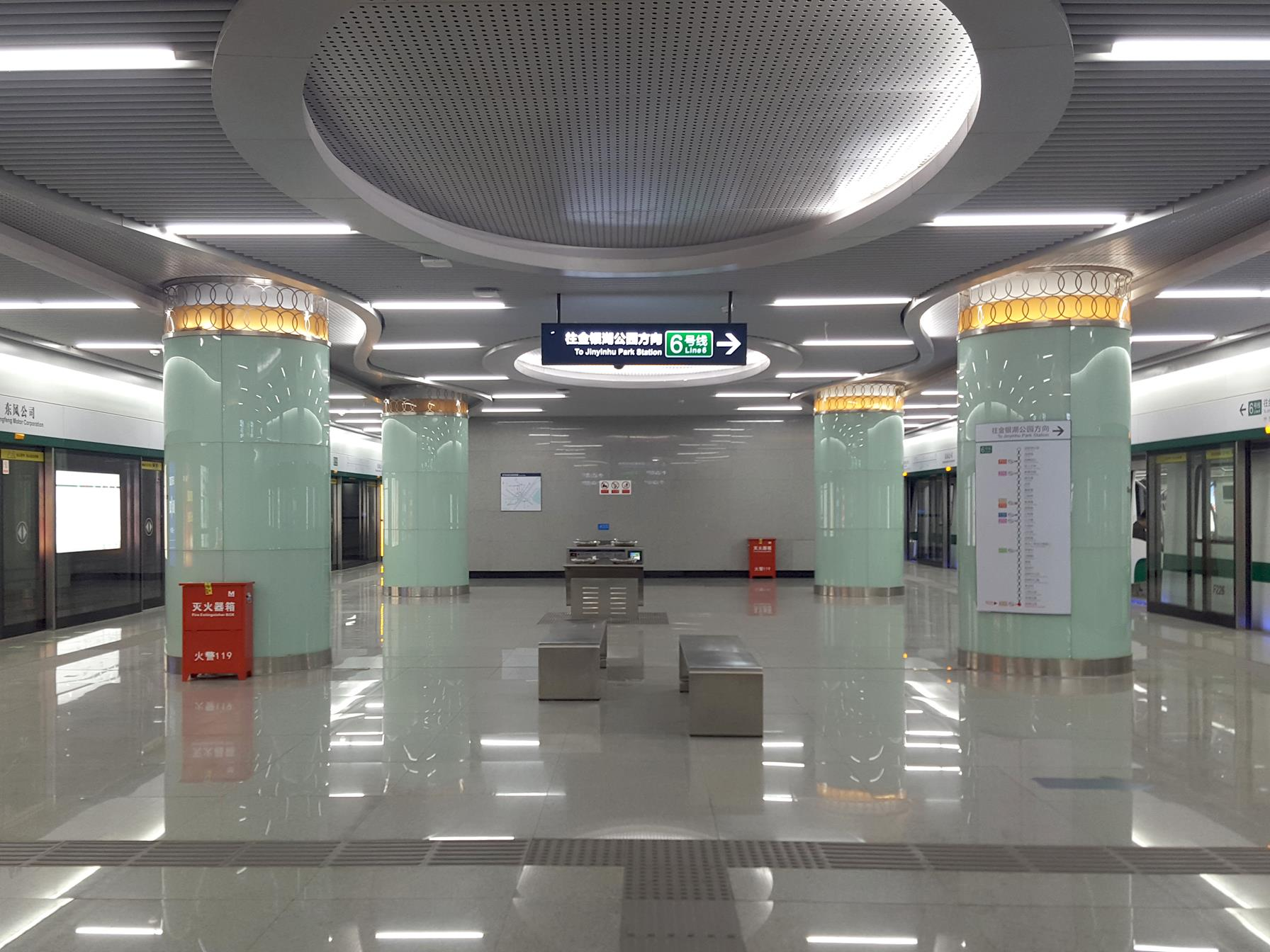
Line 6 platform
