= South International Expo Center station =

Metro station in Wuhan, China

South International Expo Center 国博中心南 metro
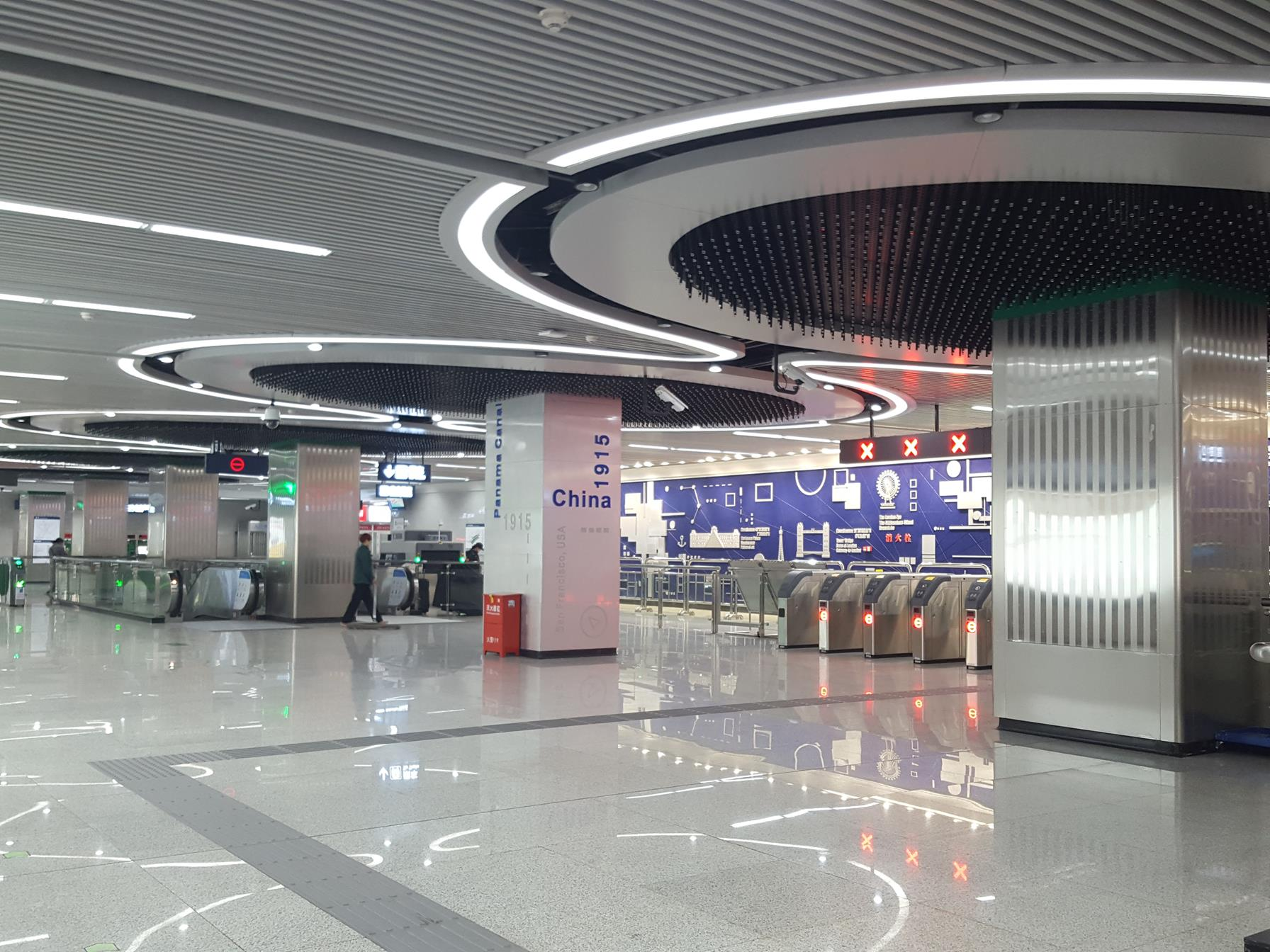

General information
- Location: Hanyang District, Wuhan, Hubei; China
- Coordinates: 30.5076°N 114.2302°E
- Operator: Wuhan Metro Co., Ltd
- Lines: Line 6 Line 12; Line 16
- Platforms: 6 (2 island platforms, 2 side platforms)

Construction
- Structure type: Underground

History
- Opened: December 28, 2016 (Line 6); December 26, 2021 (Line 16); May 1, 2026 (Line 12)

Services
| Preceding station | Wuhan Metro | Following station |
|---|---|---|
| North International Expo Center towards Xincheng 11th Road | Line 6 | Laoguancun towards Dongfeng Motor Corporation |
| Jiataohe Outer Circle | Line 12 | Guoboxincheng Inner Circle |
| Terminus | Line 16 | Laoguancun towards Hannan General Airport |
Location

South International Expo Center Station (Chinese: 国博中心南站) is a station on Line 6, Line 12 and Line 16 of the Wuhan Metro. It entered revenue service on December 28, 2016. It is located in Hanyang District.

== Station layout ==
| G | Entrances and Exits | Exits A-F |
| B1 | Concourse | Faregates, Station Agent |
| B2 | Northbound | ← Line 6 towards Xincheng 11th Road (North International Expo Center) |
| B2 | Island platform, doors will open on the left |
| B2 | Southbound | Line 6 towards Dongfeng Motor Corporation (Laoguancun) → |
| B3 | Northbound | ← Line 16 termination platform |
| B3 | Island platform, doors will open on the left |
| B3 | Southbound | Line 16 towards Hannan General Airport (Laoguancun) → |
| B4 | | Transfer passage |
| B5 | Side platform, doors will open on the right |
| B5 | Outer Circle | Line 12 Outer Circle (Jiataohe) |
| B5 | Inner Circle | Line 12 Inner Circle (Guoboxincheng) |
| B5 | Side platform, doors will open on the right |
