= Hanyang railway station =

Railway station in Hanyang District, People's Republic of China

Coordinates: 30.5558°N 114.2475°E

Hanyang 汉阳
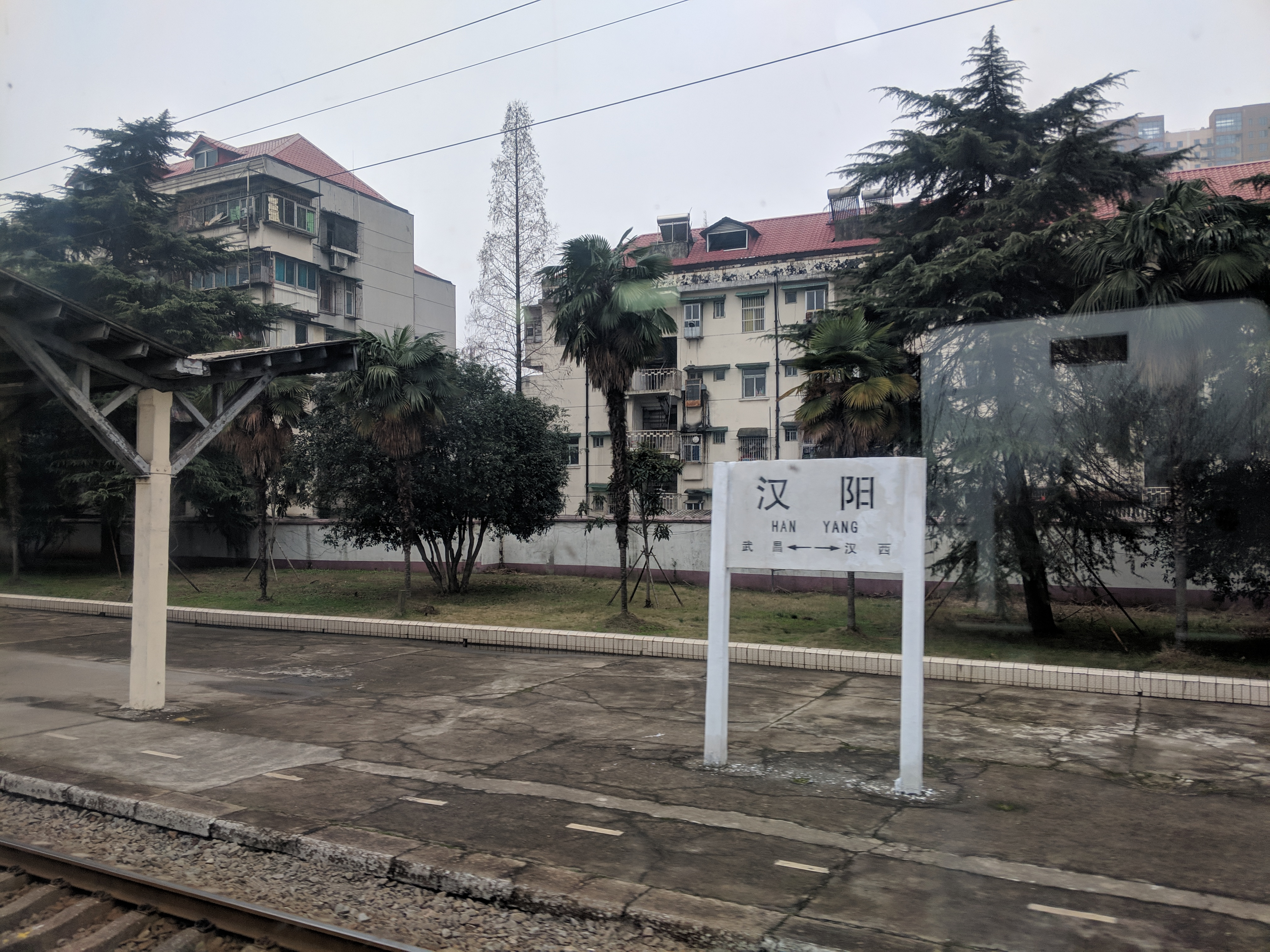

General information
- Location: Cuiwei Street, Hanyang District, Wuhan, Hubei; China
- Operated by: China Railway Wuhan Group; China Railway Corporation
- Lines: Jingguang Railway, Handan Railway
- Platforms: 1

History
- Opened: 1956
Location

Hanyang railway station, located at Cuiwei Street in Hanyang District, Wuhan, Hubei, China, is a station of Jingguang Railway and Handan Railway. It will be the terminus of Inter-city rail, towards Qianjiang, Tianmen. Hanyang railway station is served by a station of the same name on Line 4 of the Wuhan Metro.

== Wuhan Metro ==
Hanyang Railway Station 汉阳火车站 metro
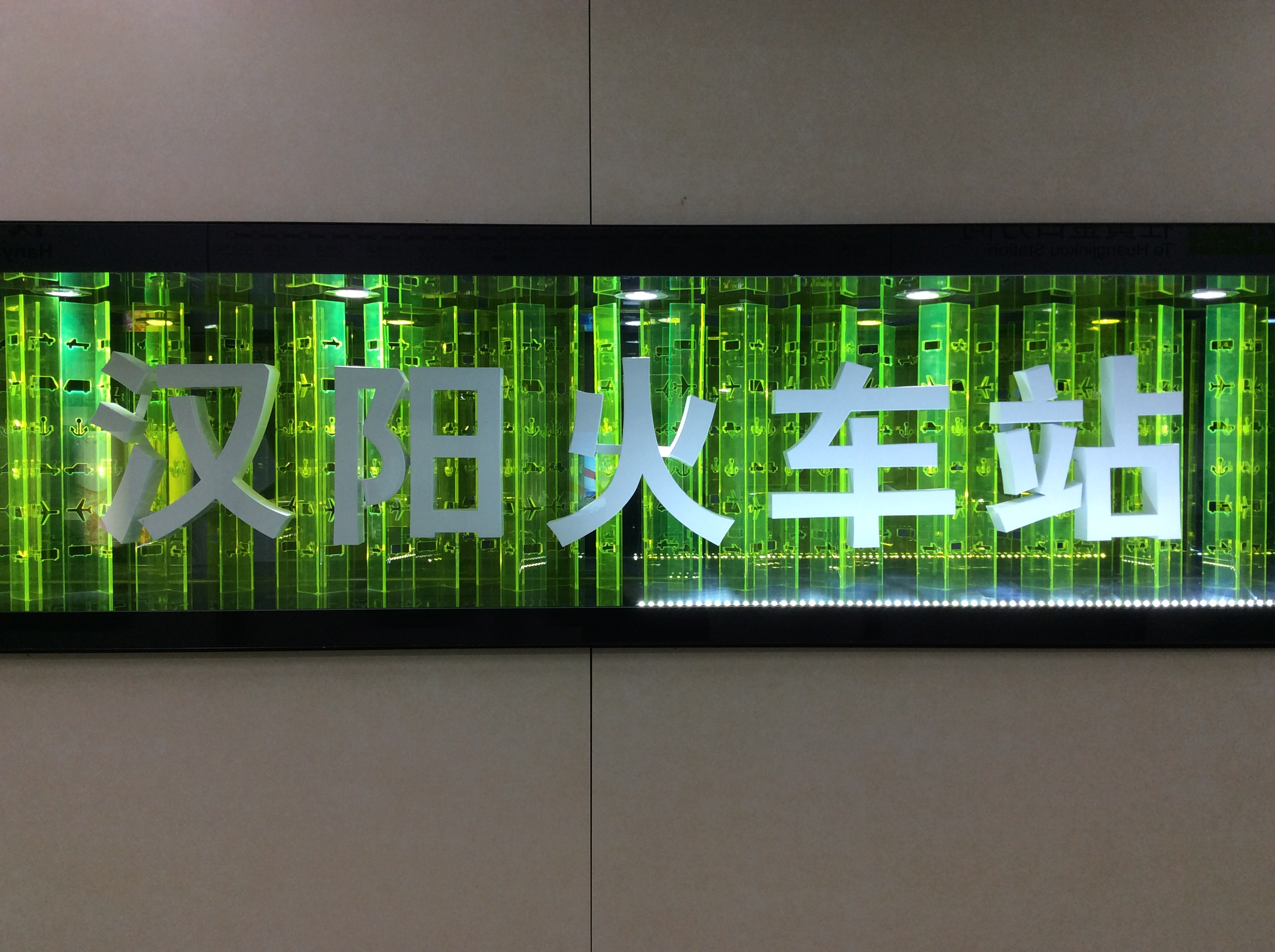

General information
- Location: Hanyang District, Wuhan, Hubei; China
- Operated by: Wuhan Metro Co., Ltd
- Line: Line 4
- Platforms: 2 (1 island platform)

Construction
- Structure type: Underground

History
- Opened: December 28, 2014

Services
Preceding station	Wuhan Metro	Following station
Wulidun towards Bailin	Line 4	Zhongjiacun towards Wuhan Railway Station
Location

Hanyang Railway Station (Chinese: 汉阳火车站), is a station on Line 4 of the Wuhan Metro. It entered revenue service on December 28, 2014. It is located in Hanyang District and it serves Hanyang railway station.

=== Station layout ===
G	Entrances and Exits
B1	Concourse	Faregates, Station Agent
B2	Westbound	← Line 4 towards Bailin (Wulidun)
B2	Island platform, doors will open on the left
B2	Eastbound	Line 4 towards Wuhan Railway Station (Zhongjiacun) →

=== Gallery ===
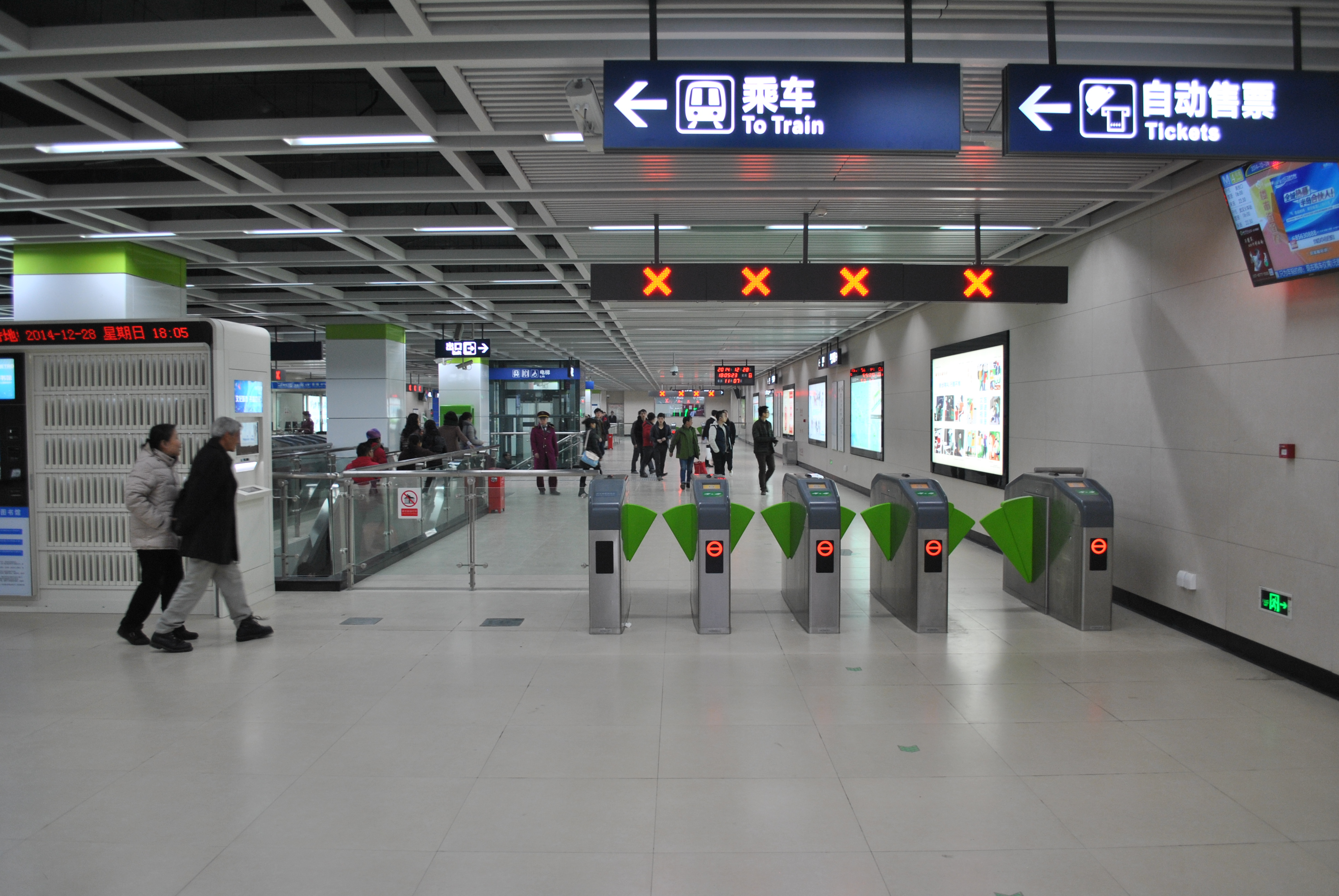
Concourse

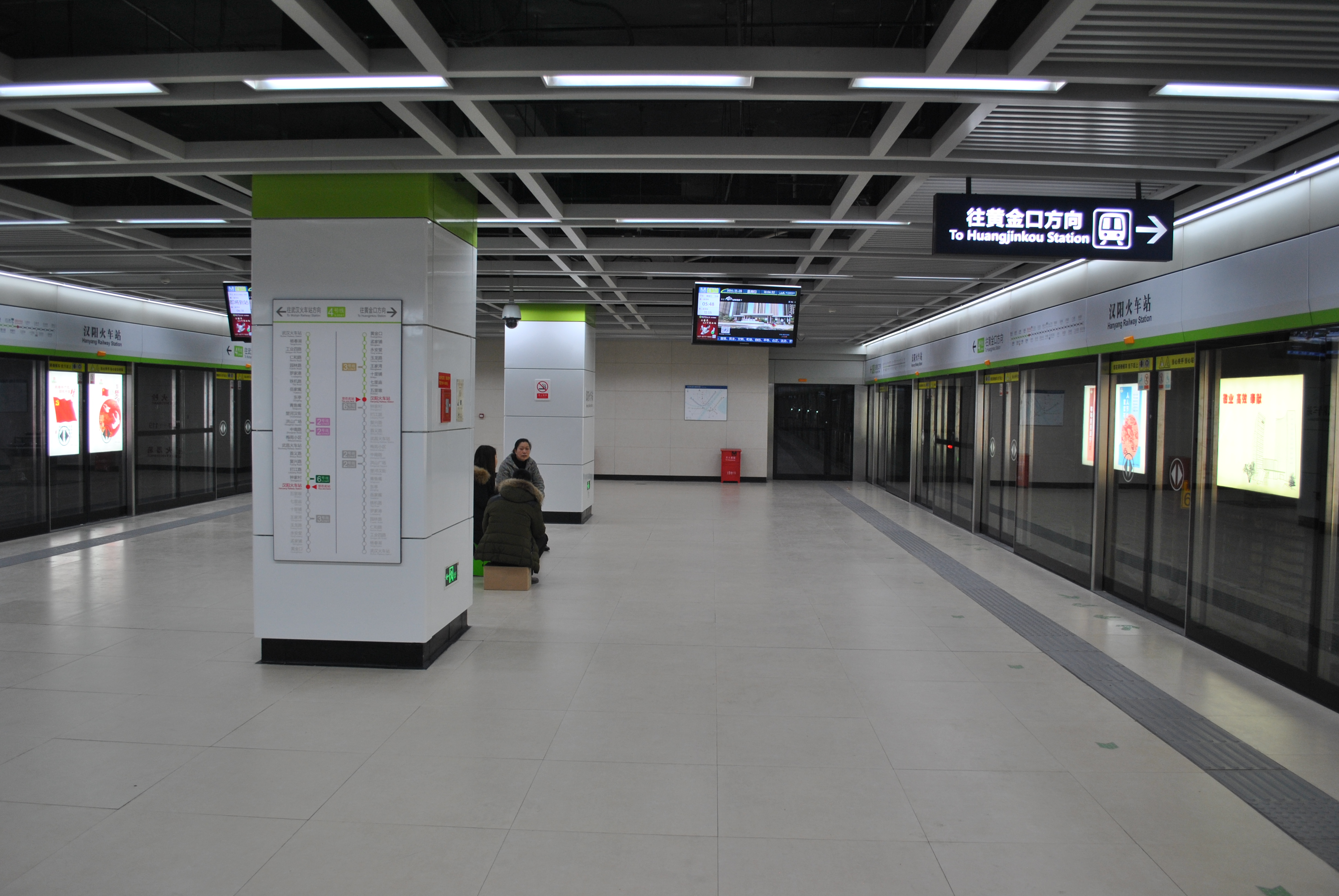
Platform
