= Laoguancun station =

Metro station in Wuhan, China

Laoguancun 老关村 metro
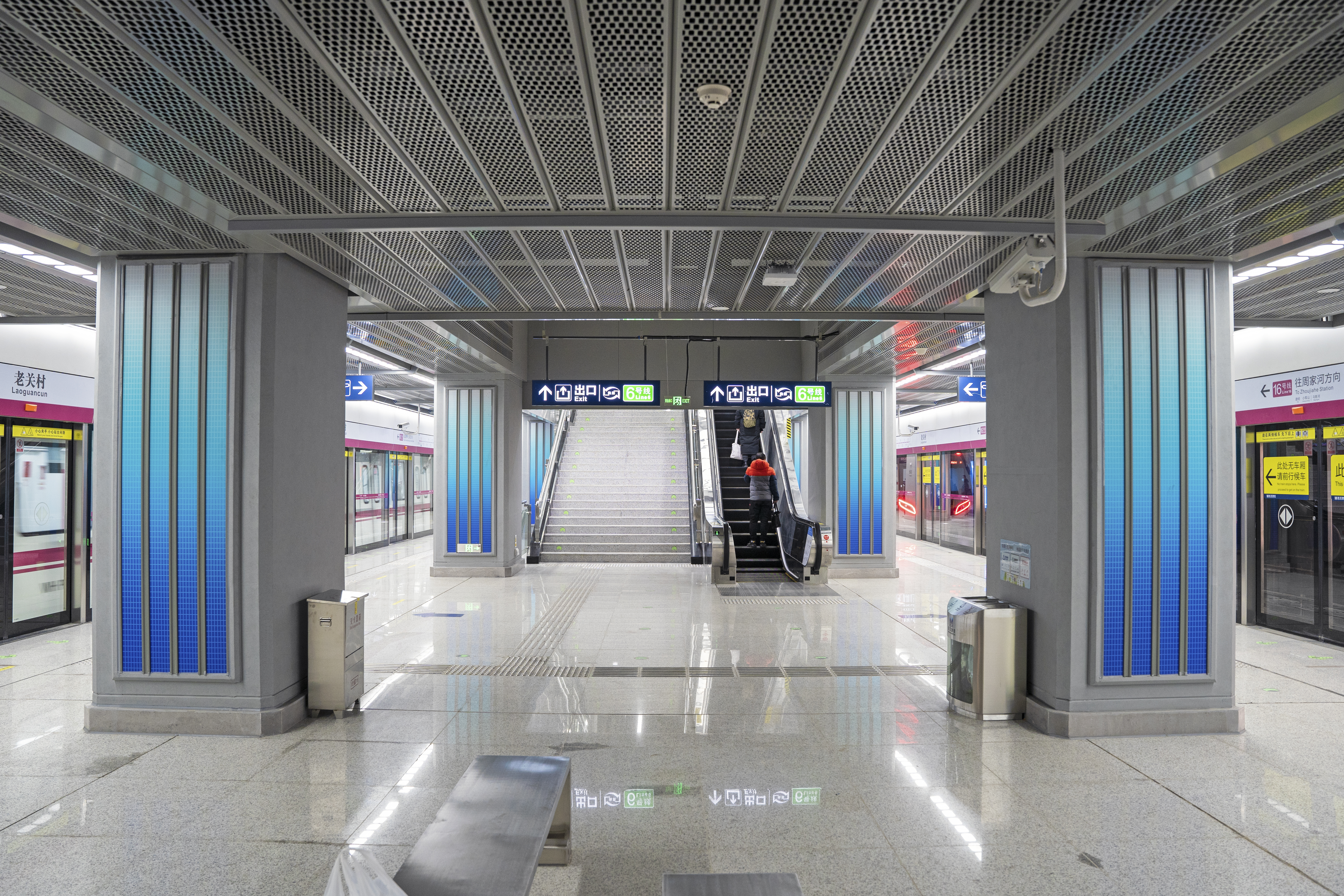

General information
- Location: Hanyang District, Wuhan, Hubei; China
- Coordinates: 30.4951°N 114.2208°E
- Operated by: Wuhan Metro Co., Ltd
- Lines: Line 6 Line 16
- Platforms: 4 (2 island platforms)

Construction
- Structure type: Underground

History
- Opened: December 28, 2016 (Line 6); December 26, 2021 (Line 16)

Services
| Preceding station | Wuhan Metro | Following station |
|---|---|---|
| South International Expo Center towards Xincheng 11th Road | Line 6 | Jiangcheng Boulevard towards Dongfeng Motor Corporation |
| South International Expo Center Terminus | Line 16 | South Taizihu towards Hannan General Airport |
Location

Laoguancun Station (Chinese: 老关村站) is a station on Line 6 and Line 16 of the Wuhan Metro. It entered revenue service on December 28, 2016. It is located in Hanyang District.

== Station layout ==
| G | Entrances and Exits | Exits A-D |
| B1 | Concourse | Faregates, Station Agent |
| B2 | Northbound | ← Line 6 towards Xincheng 11th Road (South International Expo Center) |
| B2 | Island platform, doors will open on the left |
| B2 | Southbound | Line 6 towards Dongfeng Motor Corporation (Jiangcheng Boulevard) → |
| B3 | Northbound | ← Line 16 towards South International Expo Center (Terminus) |
| B3 | Island platform, doors will open on the left |
| B3 | Southbound | Line 16 towards Hannan General Airport (South Taizihu) → |
