= Wuhan Metro rolling stock =

Rapid transit train cars in China

Wuhan Metro owns and uses the following types of rolling stock. The system track gauge is 1,435 mm standard gauge.

== Type and size ==
Wuhan Metro trains come in two sizes, Type-B cars and larger Type-A cars, both of which are commonly used by other rapid transit system in China. The size of Type-A car is larger than that of Type-B car. Type-A car has 5 pairs of doors per car, while Type-B car has 4 pairs of doors per car.

	Type-A car		Type-B car	
	Cab car	Non-cab Car	Cab car	Non-cab Car
Width	3.0 m		2.8 m	
Length	23.6 m	22.0 m	19.3 m	19.0 m
Height	3.8 m		3.8 m	
Capacity (at 6 people/m^{2})	310 people		230 people	245 people
Doors	5 pairs		4 pairs	

== Train statistics ==
All the trains of Wuhan Metro were manufactured by CRRC Changchun Railway Vehicles and CRRC Zhuzhou Locomotive, both of which have factories in Wuhan.

Line	Top speed	Type	Formation	Number of trains	Electrification	Depot
Line 1	80 km/h	Type-B car	4 cars	72	750V DC, third rail	Gutian Depot; Qiaokou Road Depot; Hankou North Depot
Line 2	80 km/h	Type-B car	6 cars (8 cars reserved)	85	750V DC, third rail	Changqing Depot; Zhongshan North Road Depot; Tianhe Depot; Fozuling Depot
Line 3	80 km/h	Type-B car	6 cars	48	750V DC, third rail	Sanjintan Depot; Shengguandu Depot
Line 4	80 km/h	Type-B car	6 cars	70	750V DC, third rail	Qingshan Depot; Huangjinkou Depot; Bailin Depot
Line 5	80 km/h	Type-A car	6 cars	42	1500V DC, third rail	Gongrencun Depot; Qingling Depot
Line 6	80 km/h	Type-A car	6 cars	51	1500V DC, overhead line	Laoguancun Depot; Jinyinhu Depot
Line 7	100 km/h	Type-A car	6 cars (8 cars reserved)	55	1500V DC, third rail	Yezhihu Depot; Changfeng Depot; Zhifang Depot
Line 8	80 km/h	Type-A car	6 cars (8 cars reserved)	47	1500V DC, third rail	Sanjintan Depot; Yezhihu Depot
Line 11	100 km/h	Type-A car	6 cars (8 cars reserved)	12	1500V DC, third rail	Changlingshan Depot
Line 12	80 km/h	Type-A car	6 cars (8 cars reserved)	79 (43 now in use)	1500V DC, third rail	Banqiao Parking Lot
Line 16	120 km/h	Type-A car	4 cars (6 cars reserved)	23	1500V DC, third rail	Hannan Depot; Dongjinghe Depot
Line 19	120 km/h	Type-A car	6 cars	15	1500V DC, overhead line	Huashan Depot
Yangluo Line	100 km/h	Type-A car	4 cars (6 cars reserved)	25	1500V DC, third rail	Daoshuihe Depot; Wuhu Depot

== Gallery ==
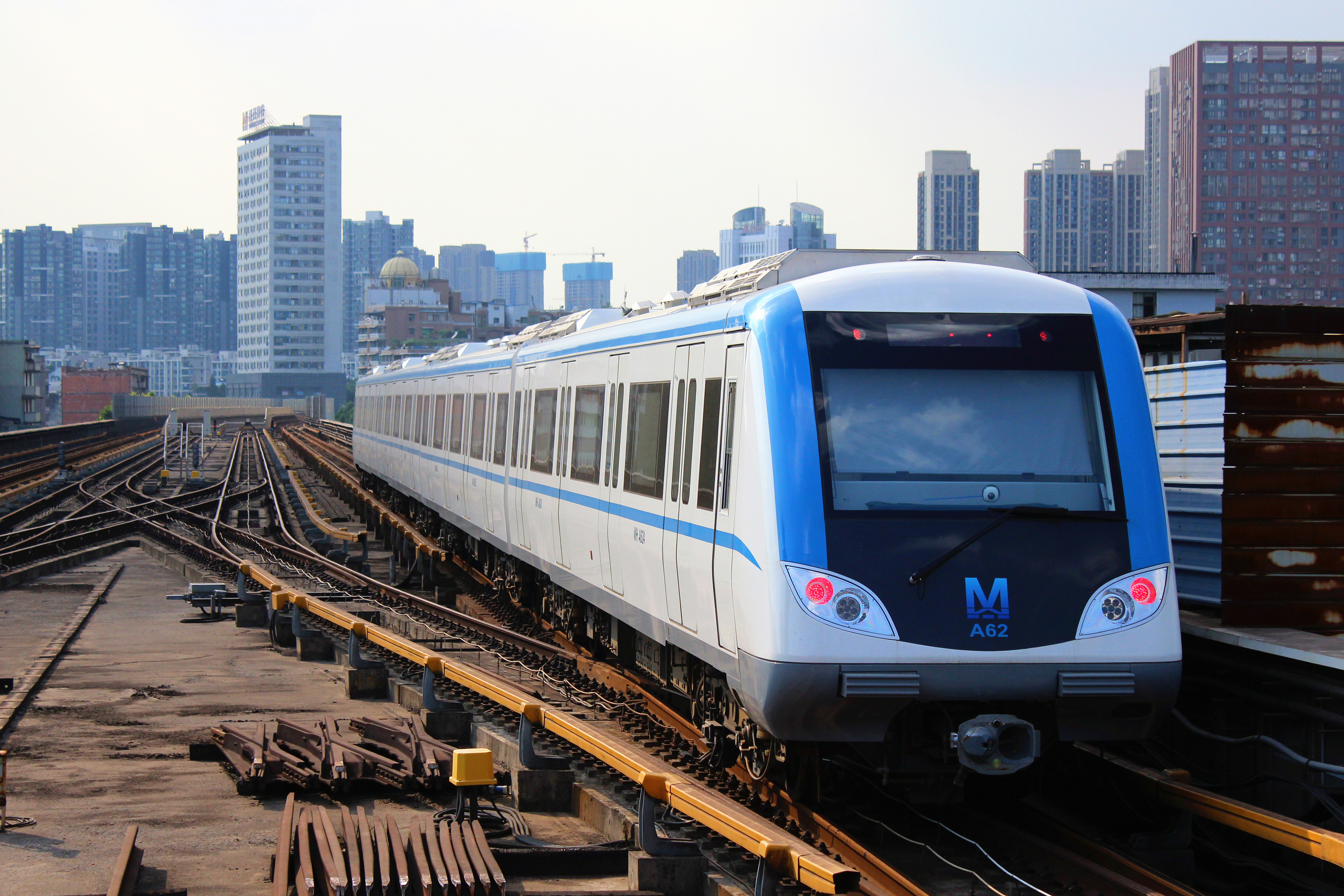
Line 1

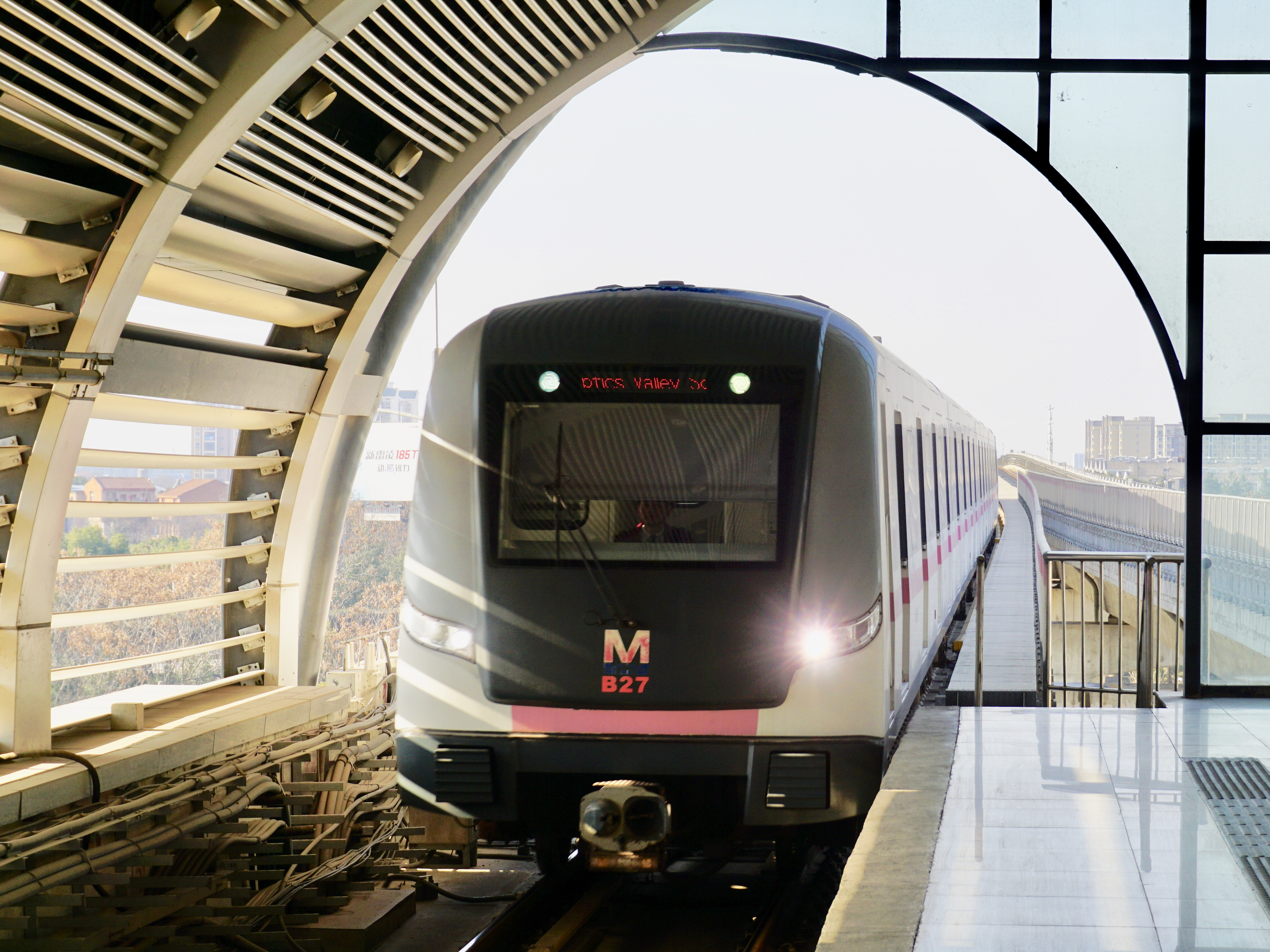
Line 2

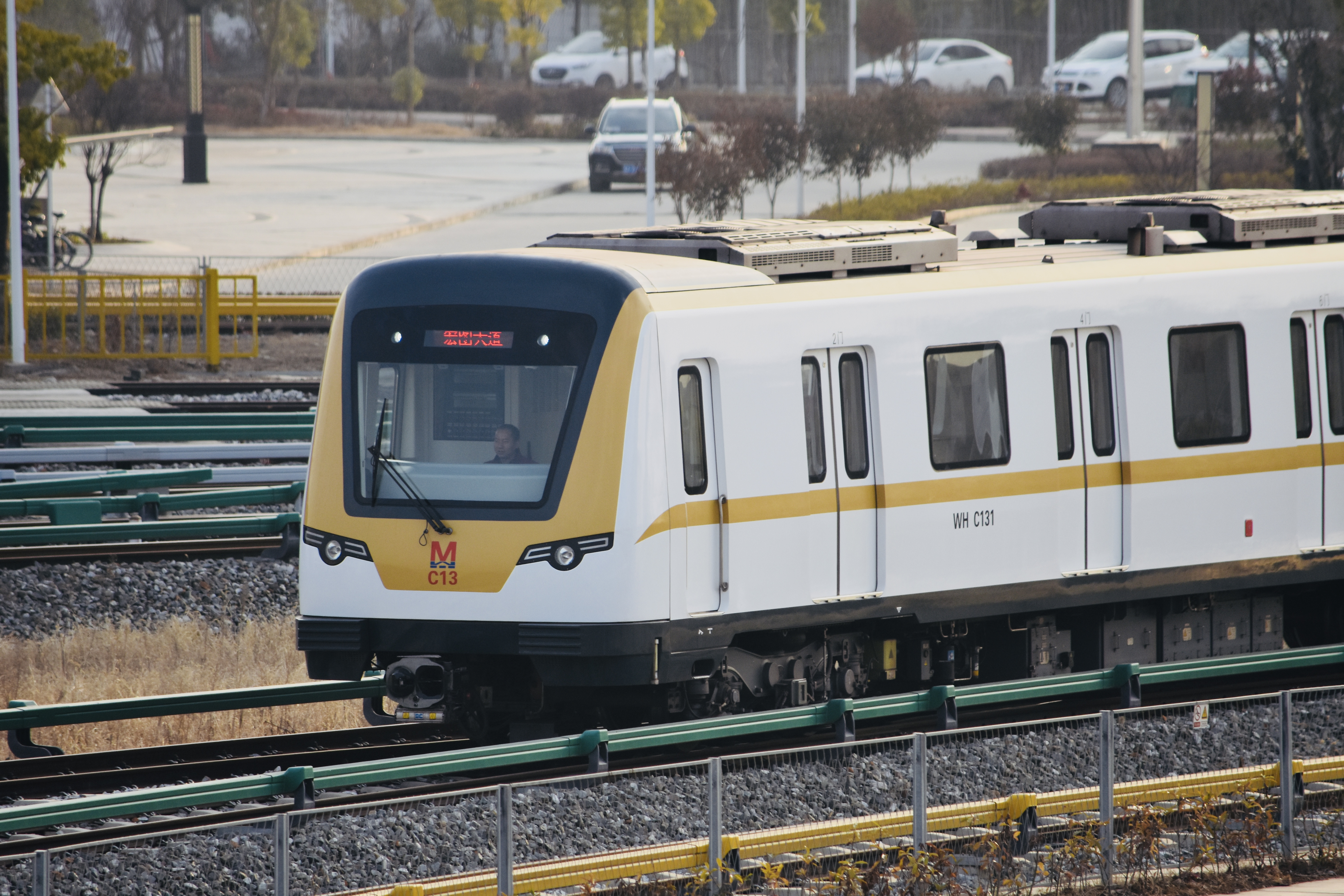
Line 3

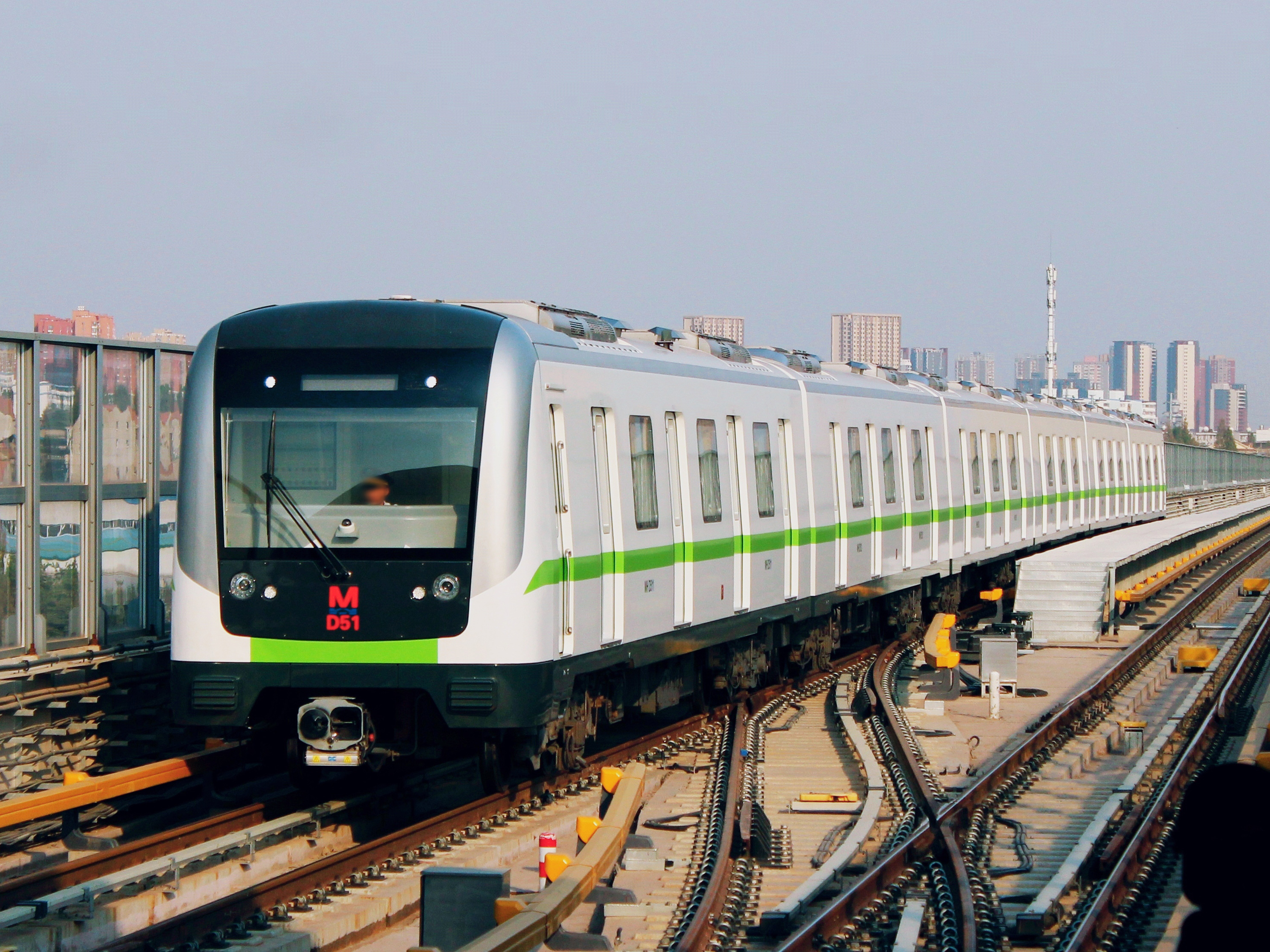
Line 4

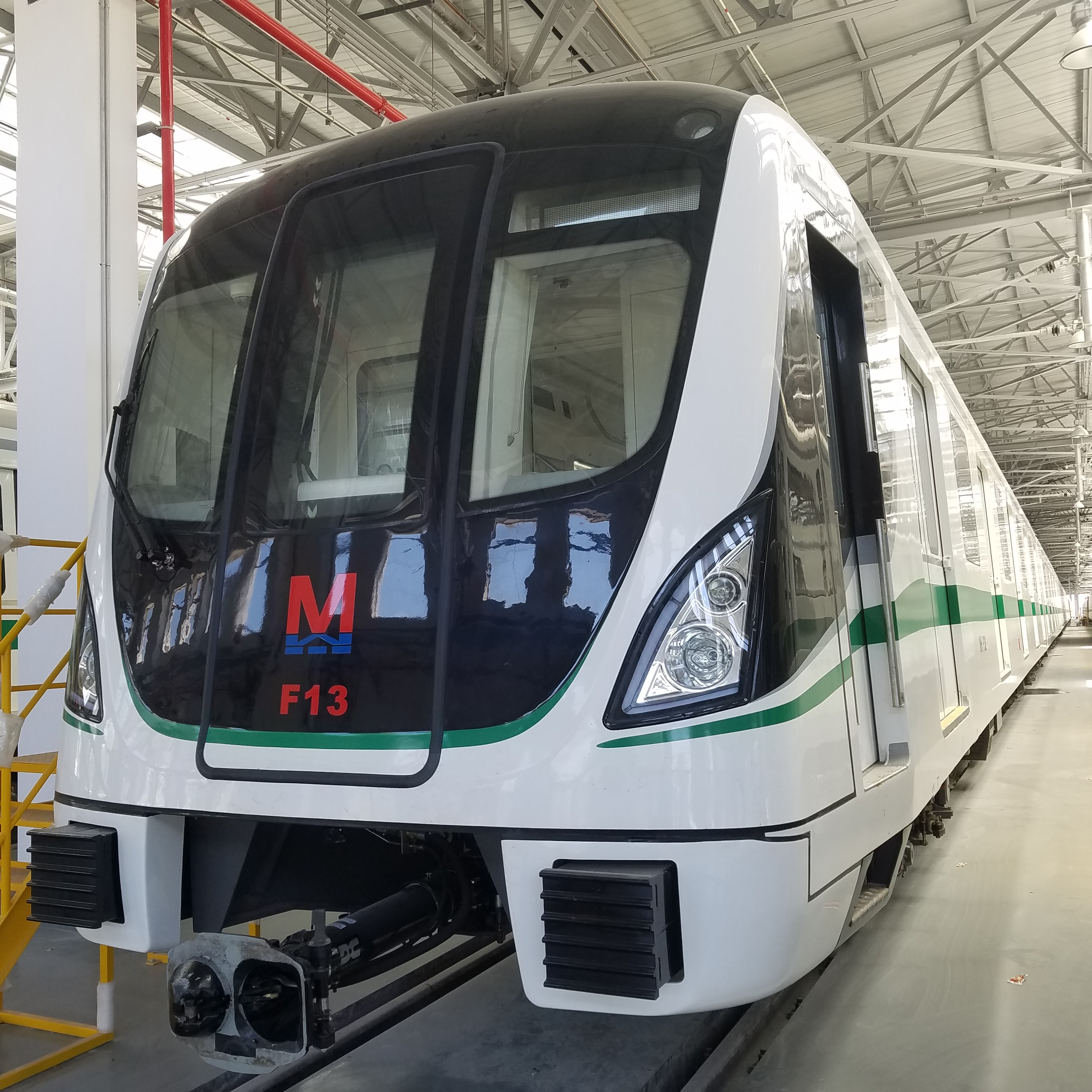
Line 6

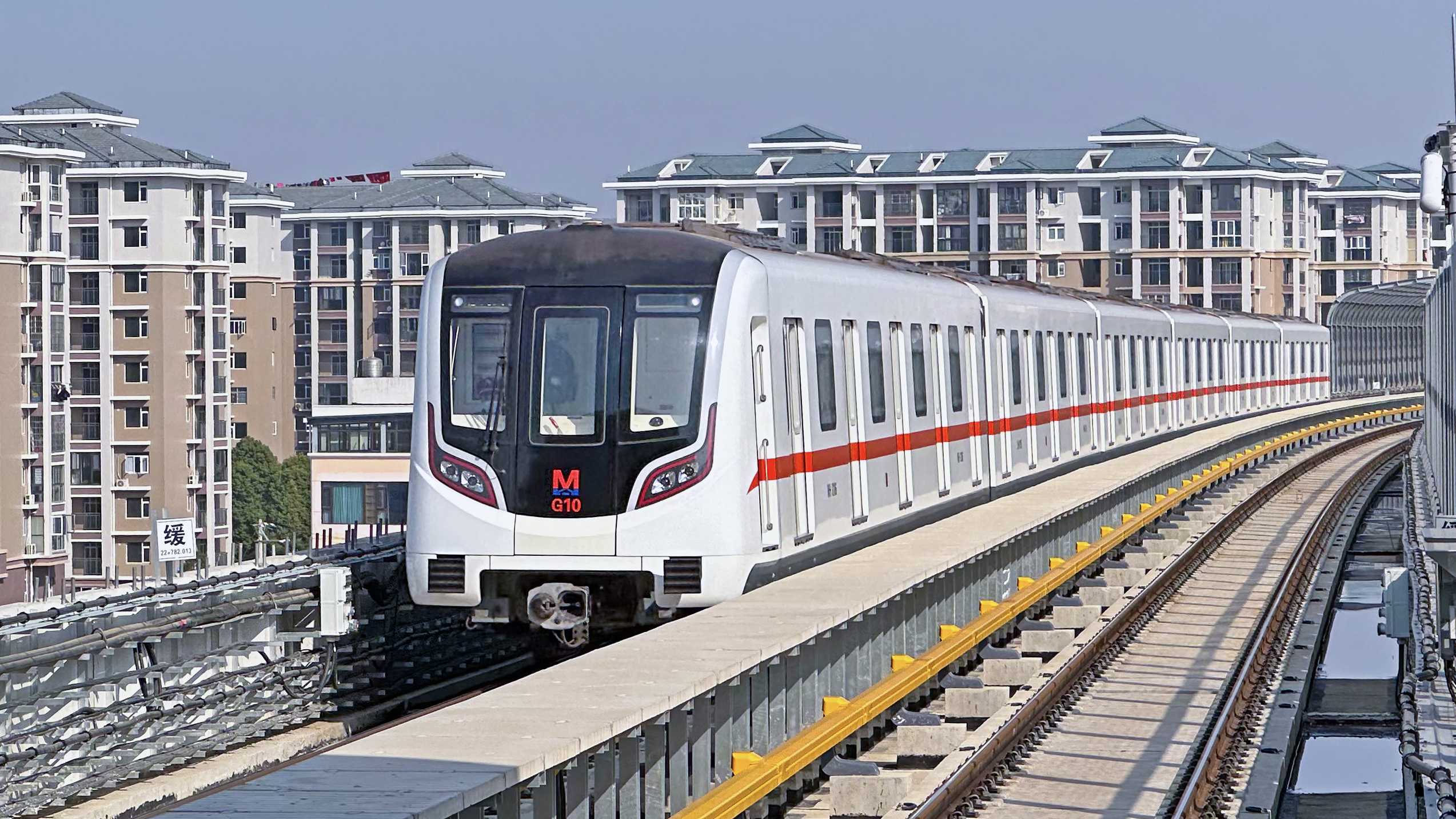
Line 7

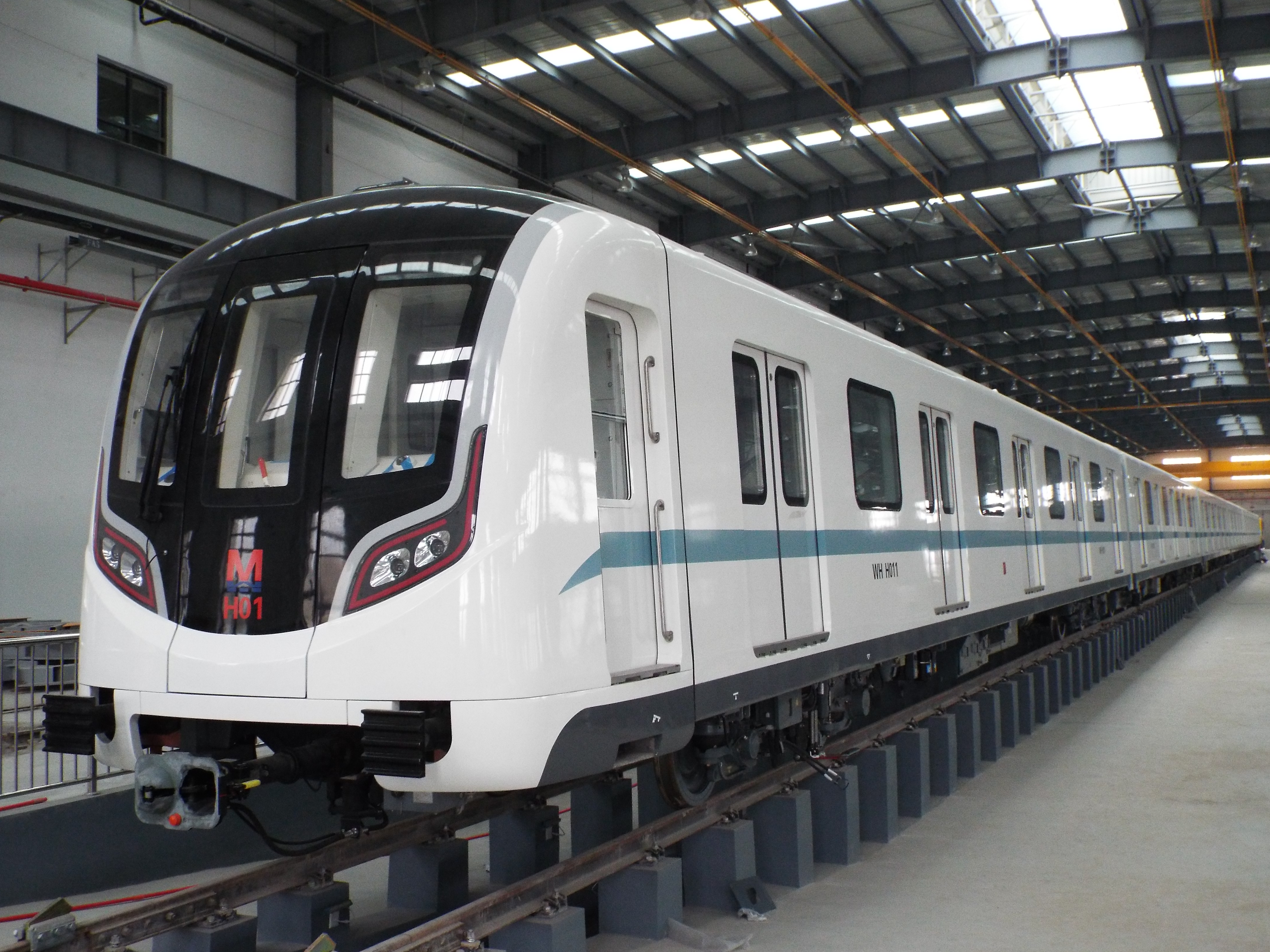
Line 8

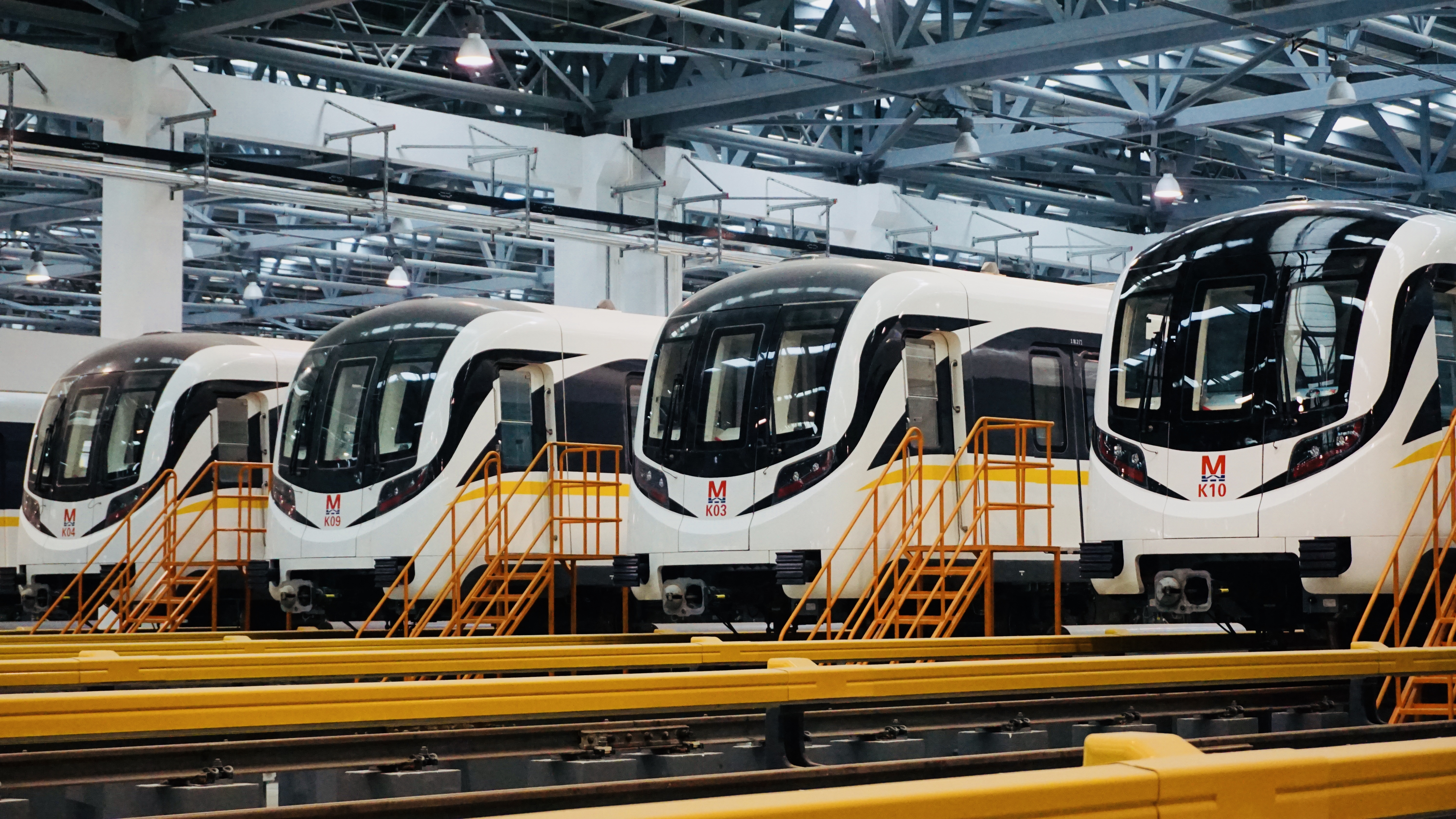
Line 11

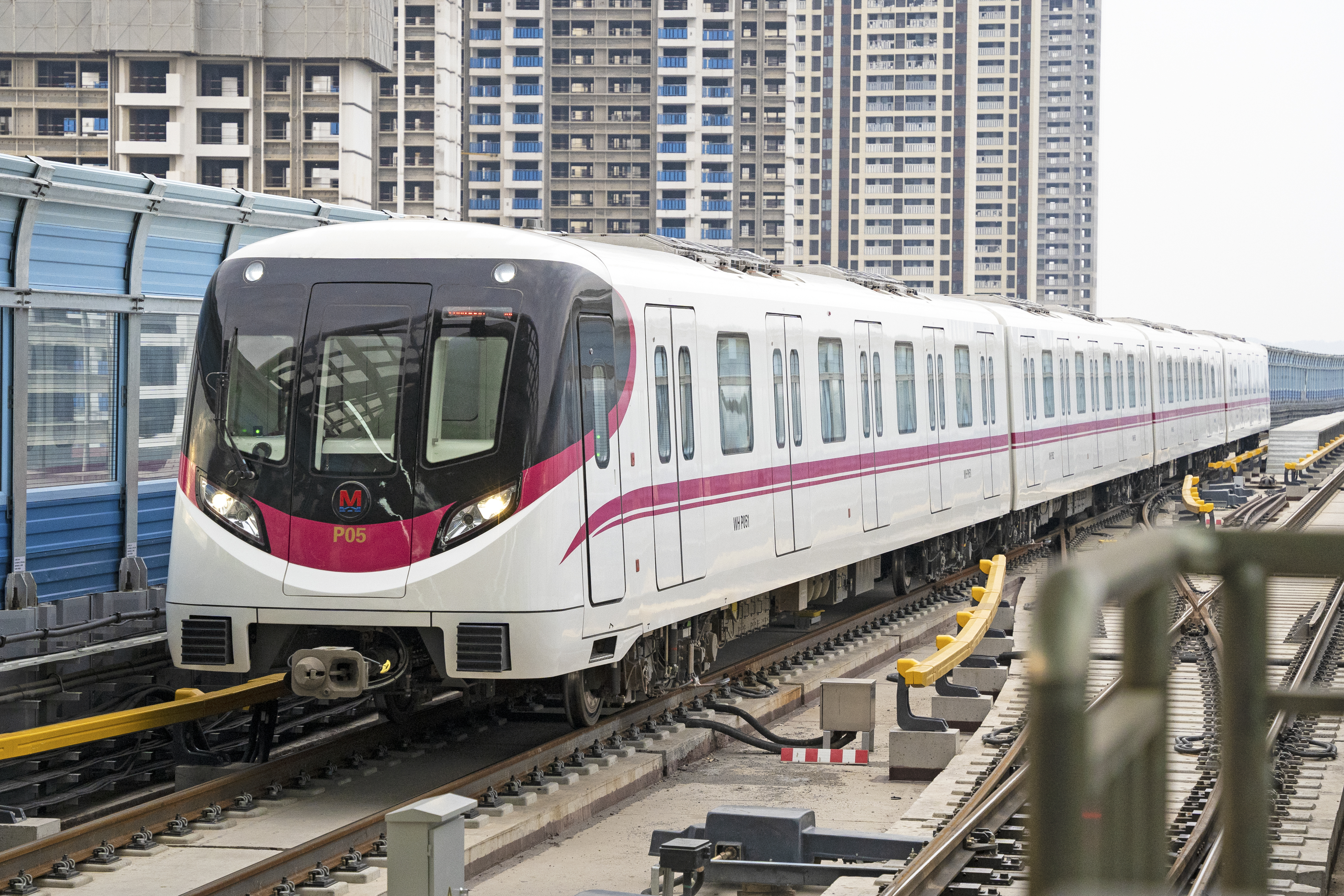
Line 16

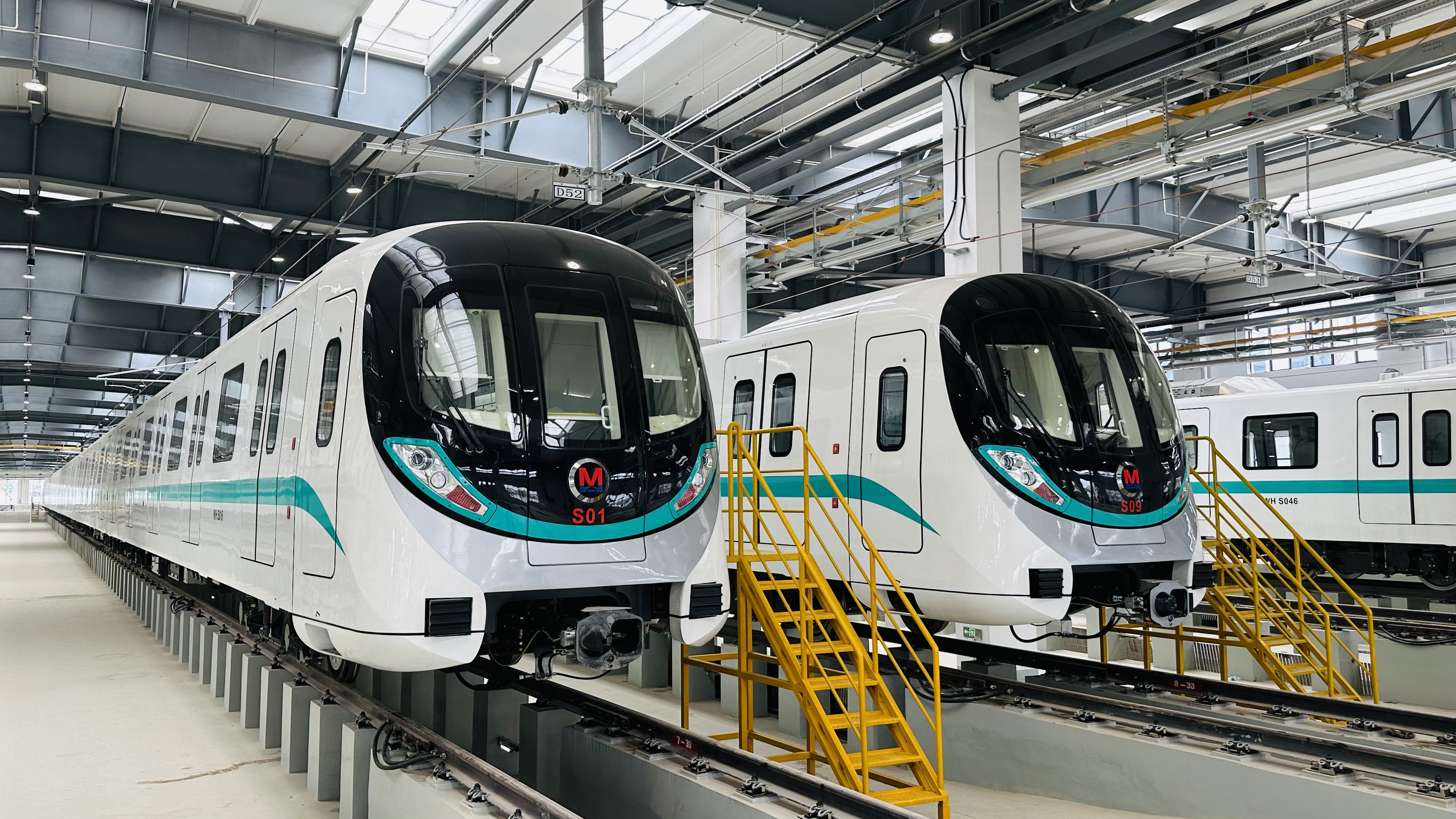
Line 19

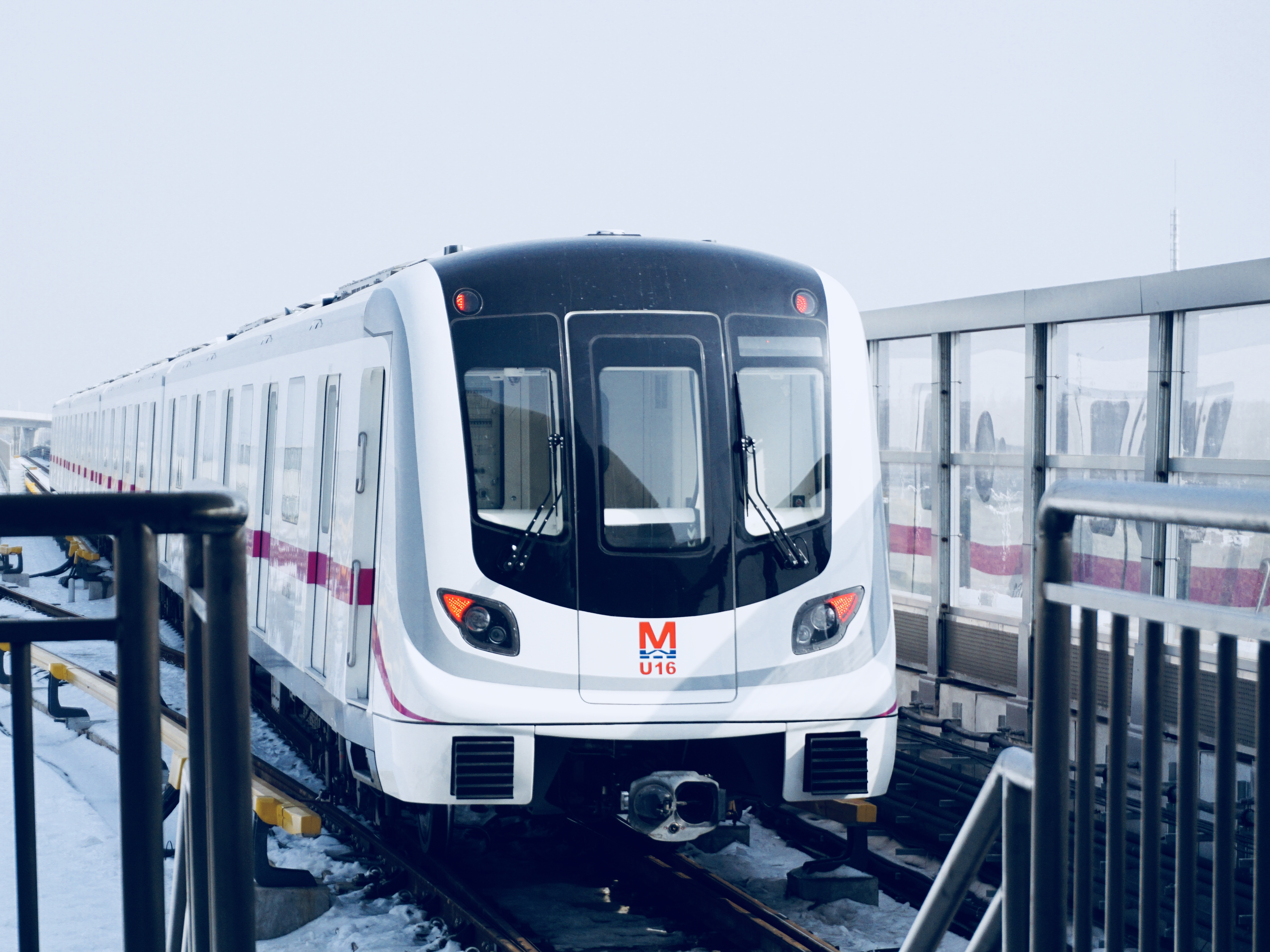
Yangluo Line

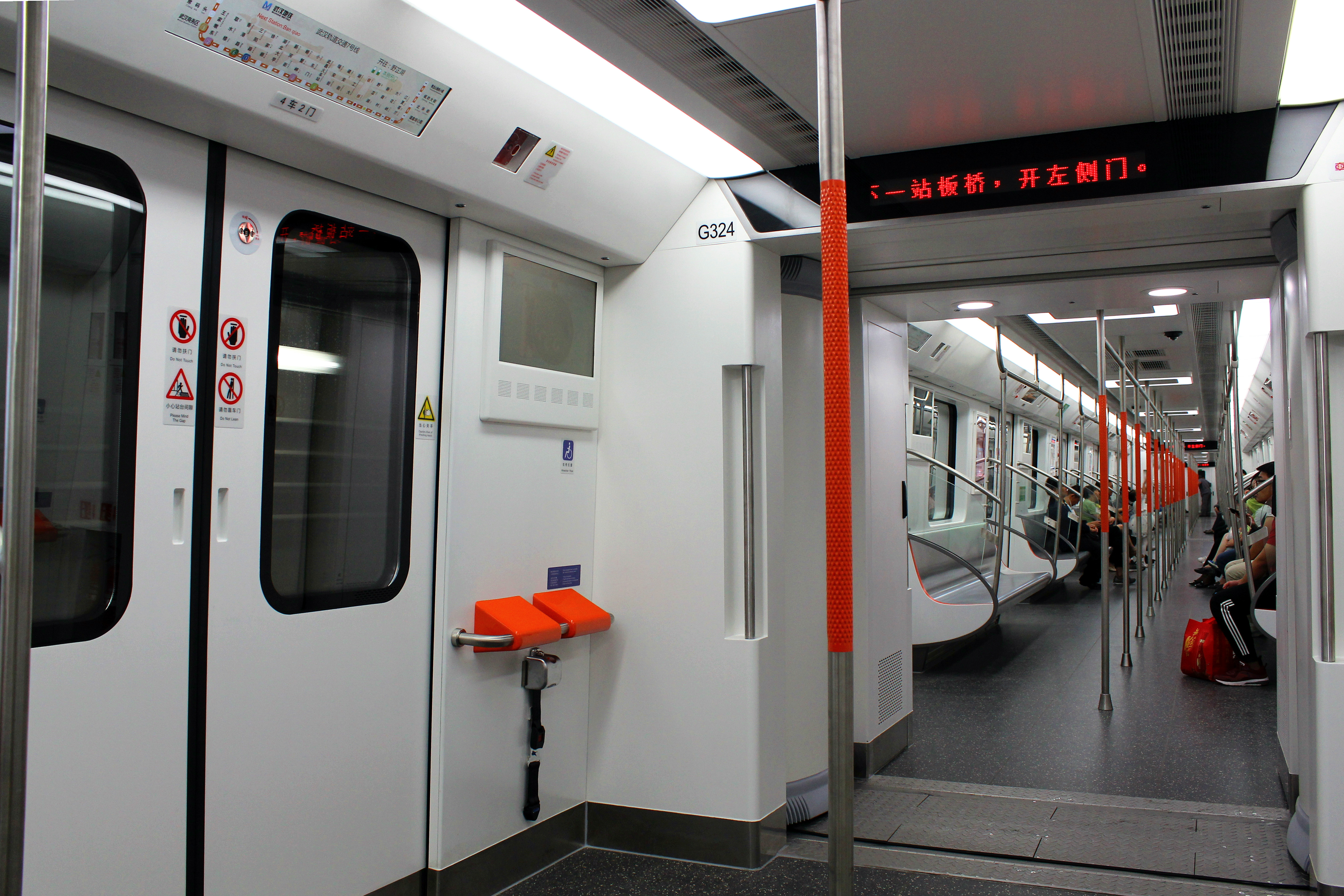
Train interior of Line 7

Train interior of Line 4

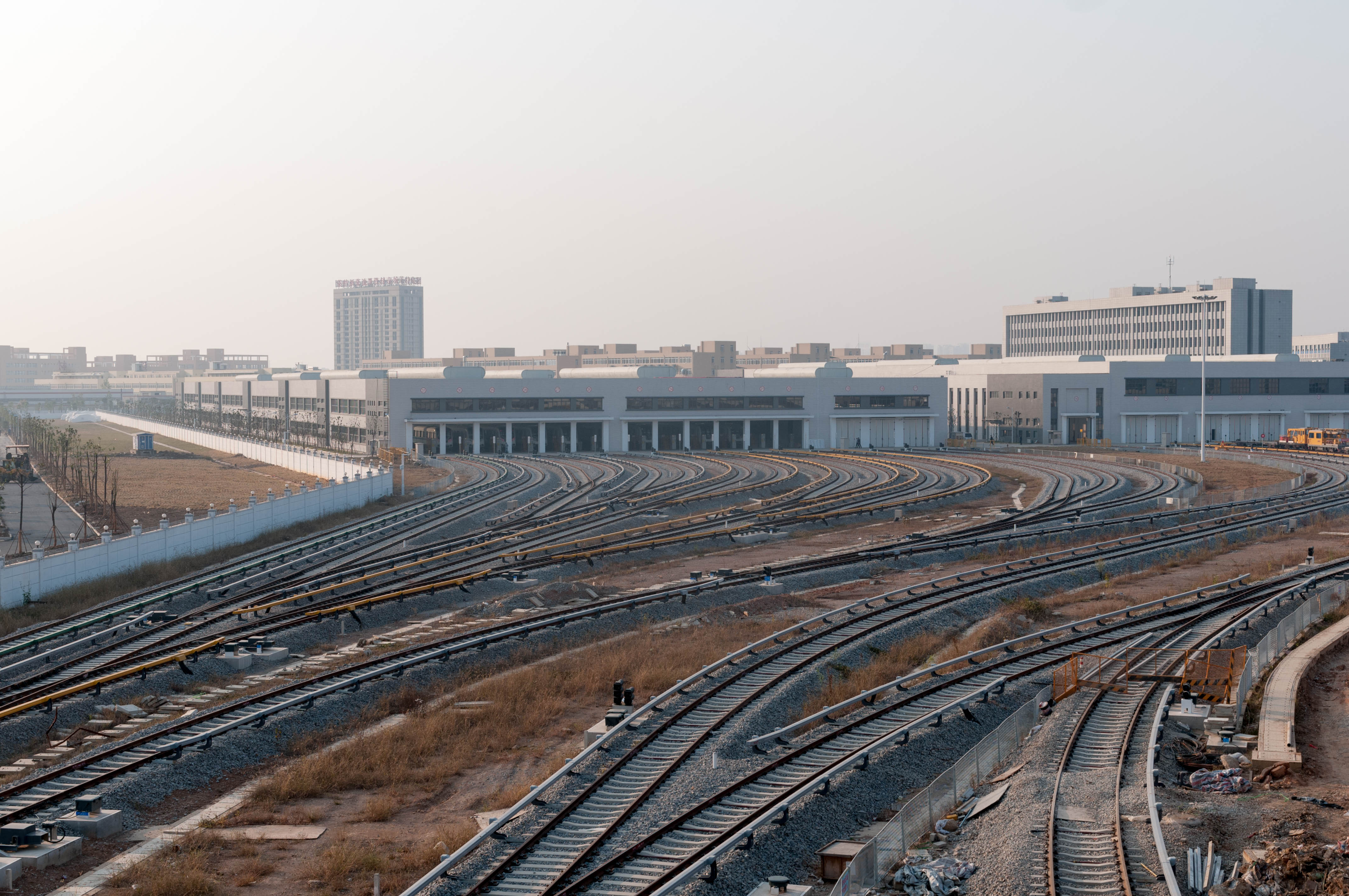
Sanjintan Depot, Line 8
