= Wuhan Hannan General Airport =

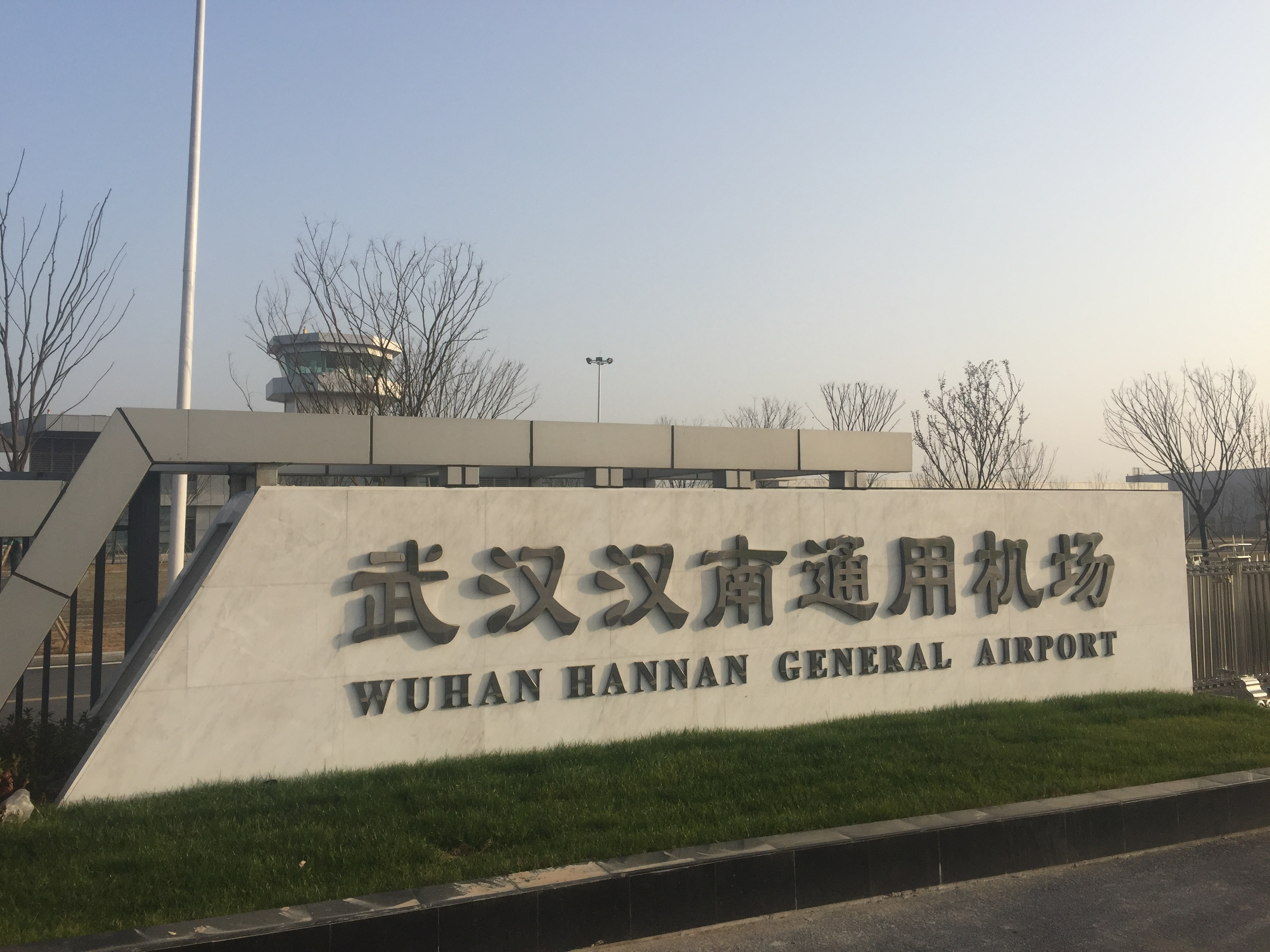

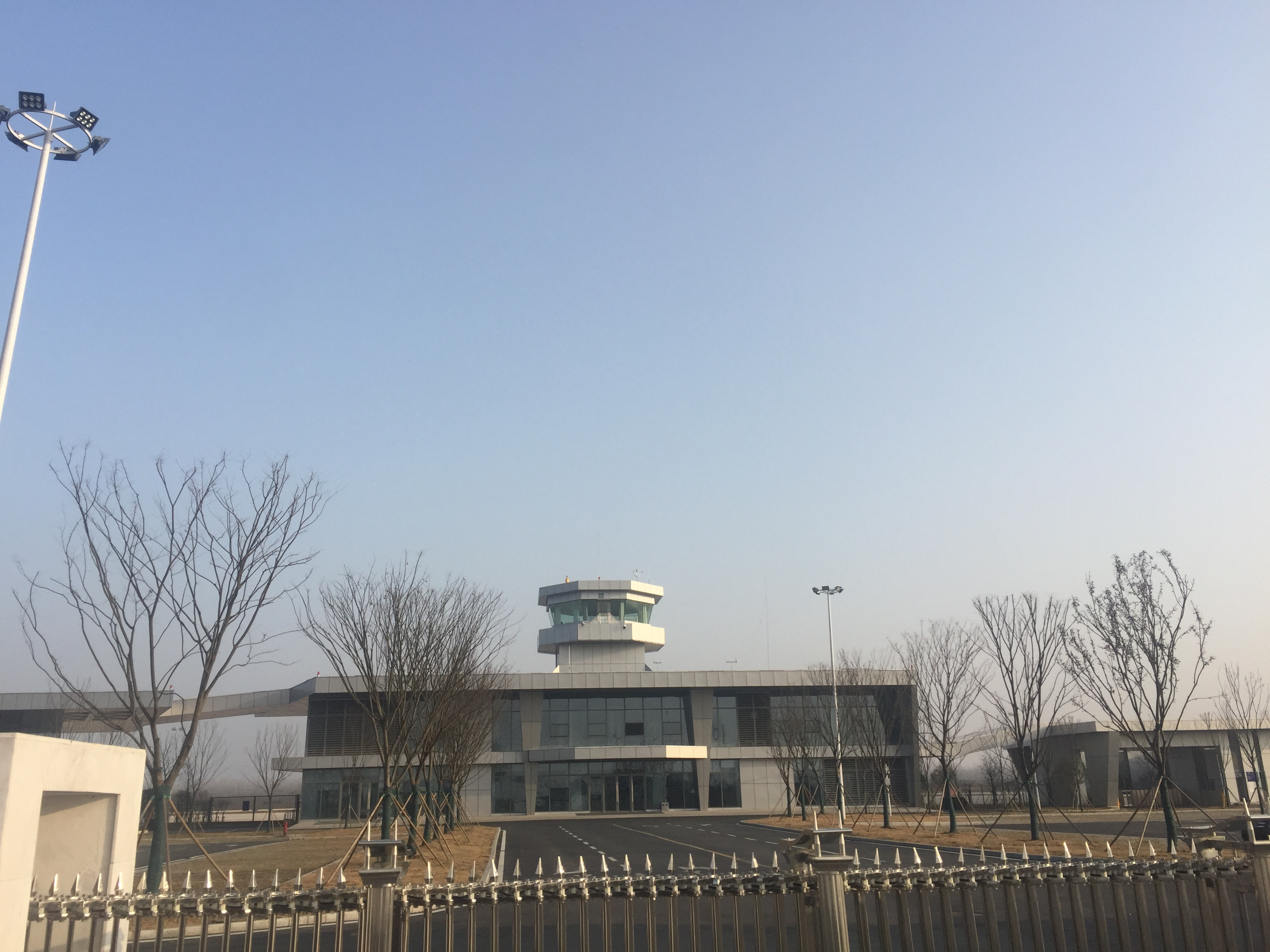
- Controller Tower of Hannan Airport
- IATA: WHN; ICAO: none

Summary
- Airport type: Public
- Owner: Wuhan Airport Administrator
- Operator: Wuhan Airport Administrator
- Serves: Wuhan
- Location: Hannan District, Wuhan
- Opened: Oct 2017
- Coordinates: 30°15′06″N 114°03′19″E

Map
- Location of airport in Hubei province Hannan (China)

Runways
Direction	Length		Surface
Direction	ft	m	Surface
04/22	5,249	1,600	Concrete

Wuhan Hannan General Airport (Chinese: 武汉汉南通用机场) is an airport for general aviation located in Hannan District, Wuhan. It is the biggest airport in China that handles only general aviation. It is considered a 2B level public airport, able to handle small aircraft such as the Cessna 208. It hosted the World Fly-in Expo 2017.

== Construction ==
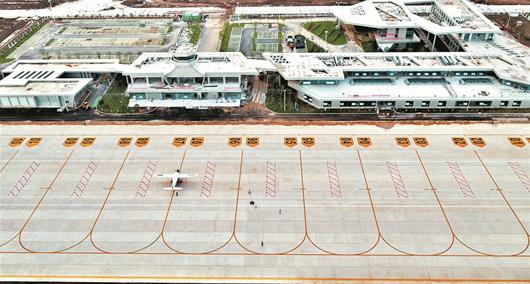
A view of Wuhan Hannan General Airport

The airport occupies 919 acres (372 ha) of land near the Yangtze River. Initial construction took 8 months.

== Facilities ==
The airport has one single runway with a parallel taxiway. The hangar can park three Boeing 737s, or about 100 small airplanes.

Its runway is 1600 m(5249 ft) long and 30 m(98 ft) wide.

It also has a GA terminal. Parking is available for 11480 cars.

== Transport ==
- Hannan General Airport station on Line 16 of Wuhan Metro

== See also ==
- Wuhan Caidian General Airport - another airport for general aviation in Caidian District, Wuhan, currently under construction
