= Wulidun station =

Wuhan Metro station in Hubei, China

Wulidun 五里墩 metro
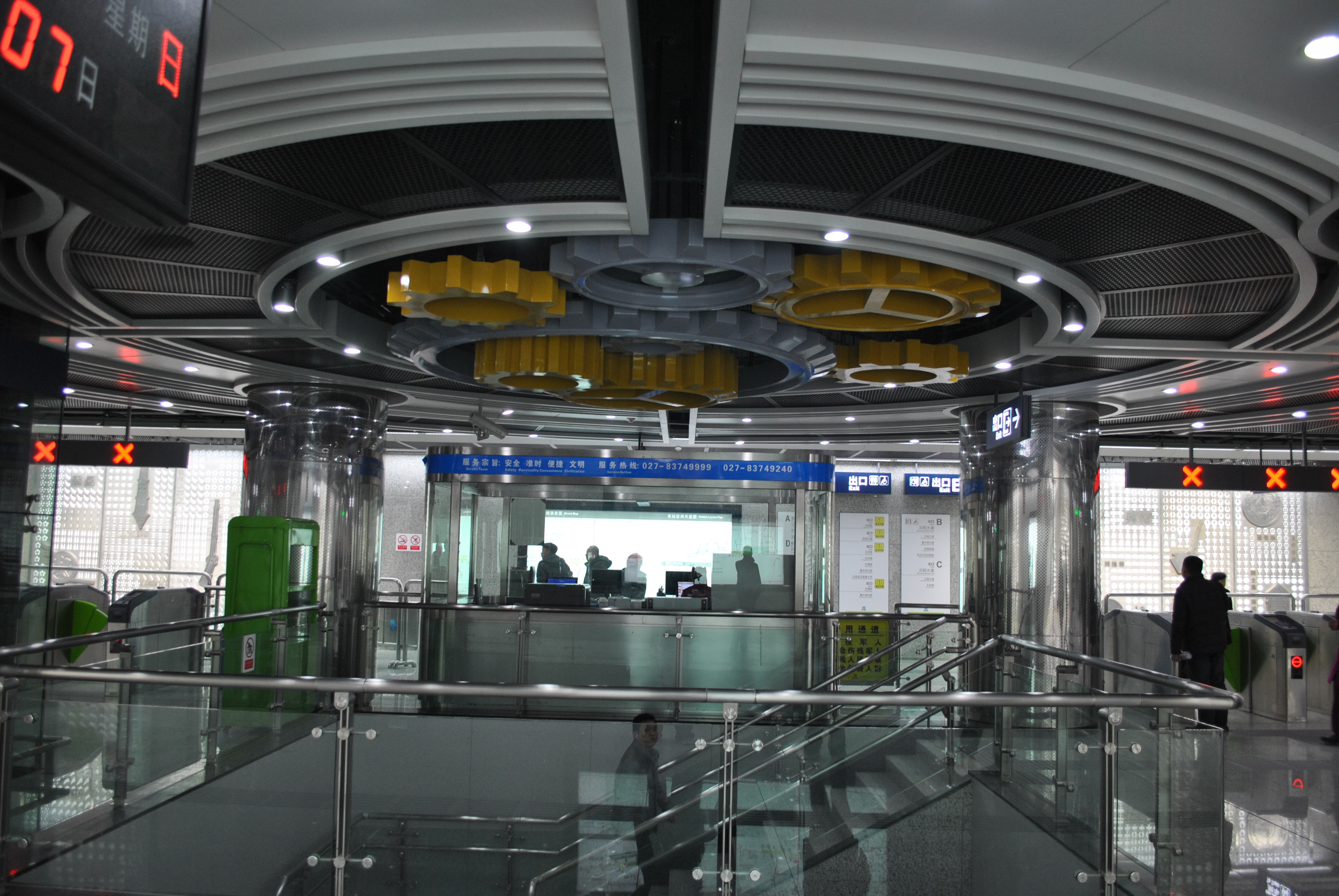

General information
- Location: Hanyang District, Wuhan, Hubei; China
- Coordinates: 30.5560°N 114.2368°E
- Operator: Wuhan Metro Co., Ltd
- Lines: Line 4; Line 10 (under planning)
- Platforms: 2 (1 island platform)

Construction
- Structure type: Underground

History
- Opened: December 28, 2014

Services
Preceding station	Wuhan Metro	Following station
Qilimiao towards Bailin	Line 4	Hanyang Railway Station towards Wuhan Railway Station
Location

Wulidun Station (Chinese: 五里墩站) is a station on Line 4 of the Wuhan Metro. It entered revenue service on December 28, 2014. It is located in Hanyang District.

== Station layout ==
G	Entrances and Exits
B1	Concourse	Faregates, Station Agent
B2	Westbound	← Line 4 towards Bailin (Qilimiao)
B2	Island platform, doors will open on the left
B2	Eastbound	Line 4 towards Wuhan Railway Station (Hanyang Railway Station) →

== Gallery ==
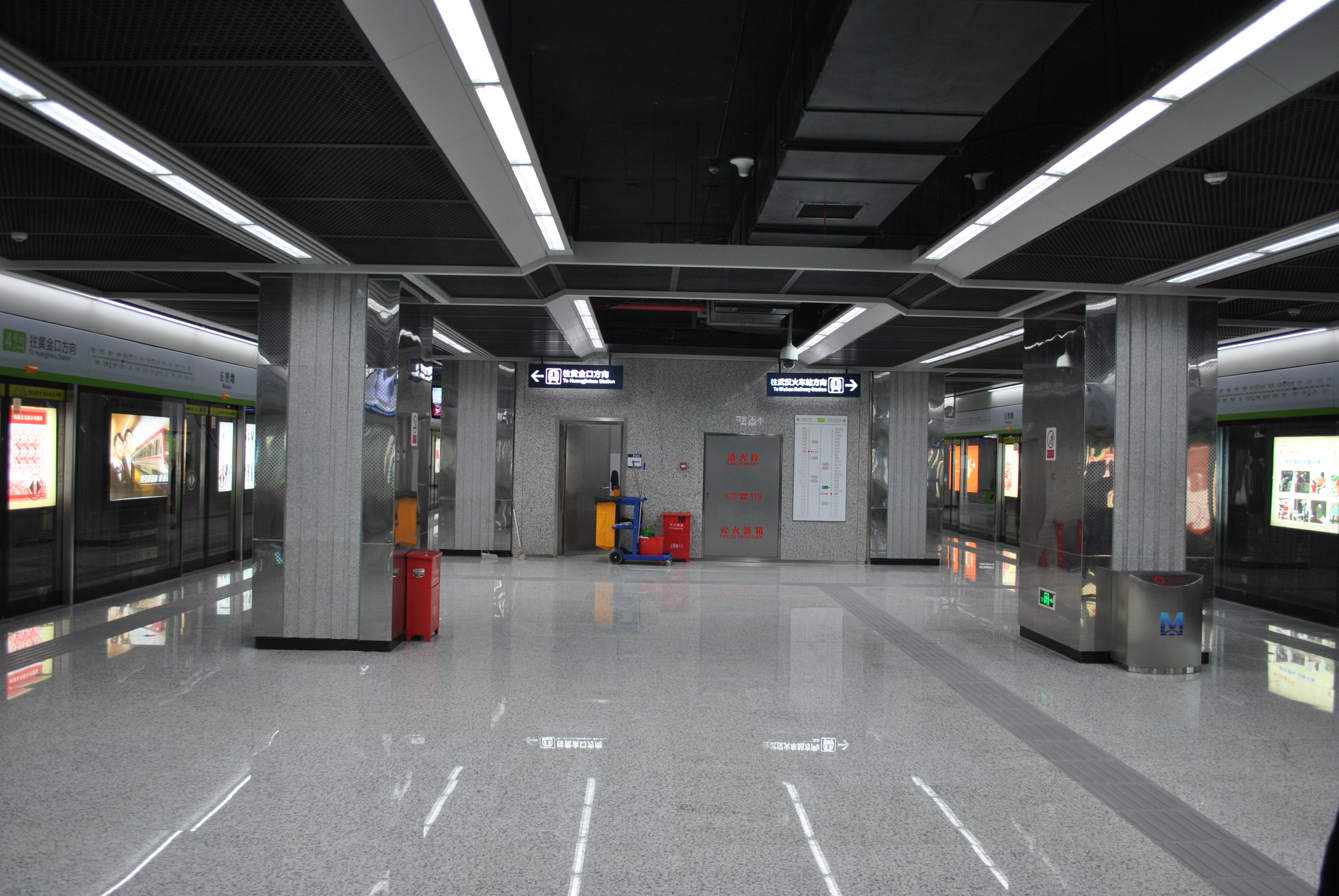
Platform
