= Wuhan Caidian General Airport =

- IATA: none; ICAO: none

Summary
- Airport type: Public
- Serves: Wuhan
- Location: Caidian District, Wuhan, Hubei, China

Runways
Direction	Length		Surface
Direction	ft	m	Surface
	5,249	1,600	concrete

Wuhan Caidian General Airport (Chinese: 武汉蔡甸通用机场) is an under-construction airport for general aviation located in Caidian District, Wuhan. The airport began construction on 1 December 2017. The airport will be the second airport dedicated to general aviation in Wuhan, after Wuhan Hannan General Airport.

The airport covers 500 acres of land, with a 1600 m (5249 ft) long, 30 m (98 ft) wide runway. The airport is slated to finish construction by the end of 2018, and be handed over to the city government by the start of 2019. The airport construction will spend about 300 million CNY (estimated).

Spokesmen for the government said they plan to extend the runway from 1600 m up to 2200 m, after the airport's construction finished, in order to offer service to some private jets.

== See also ==
- Wuhan Hannan General Airport
