= Guiyuan Temple =

Buddhist temple in Wuhan, China

- 归元寺
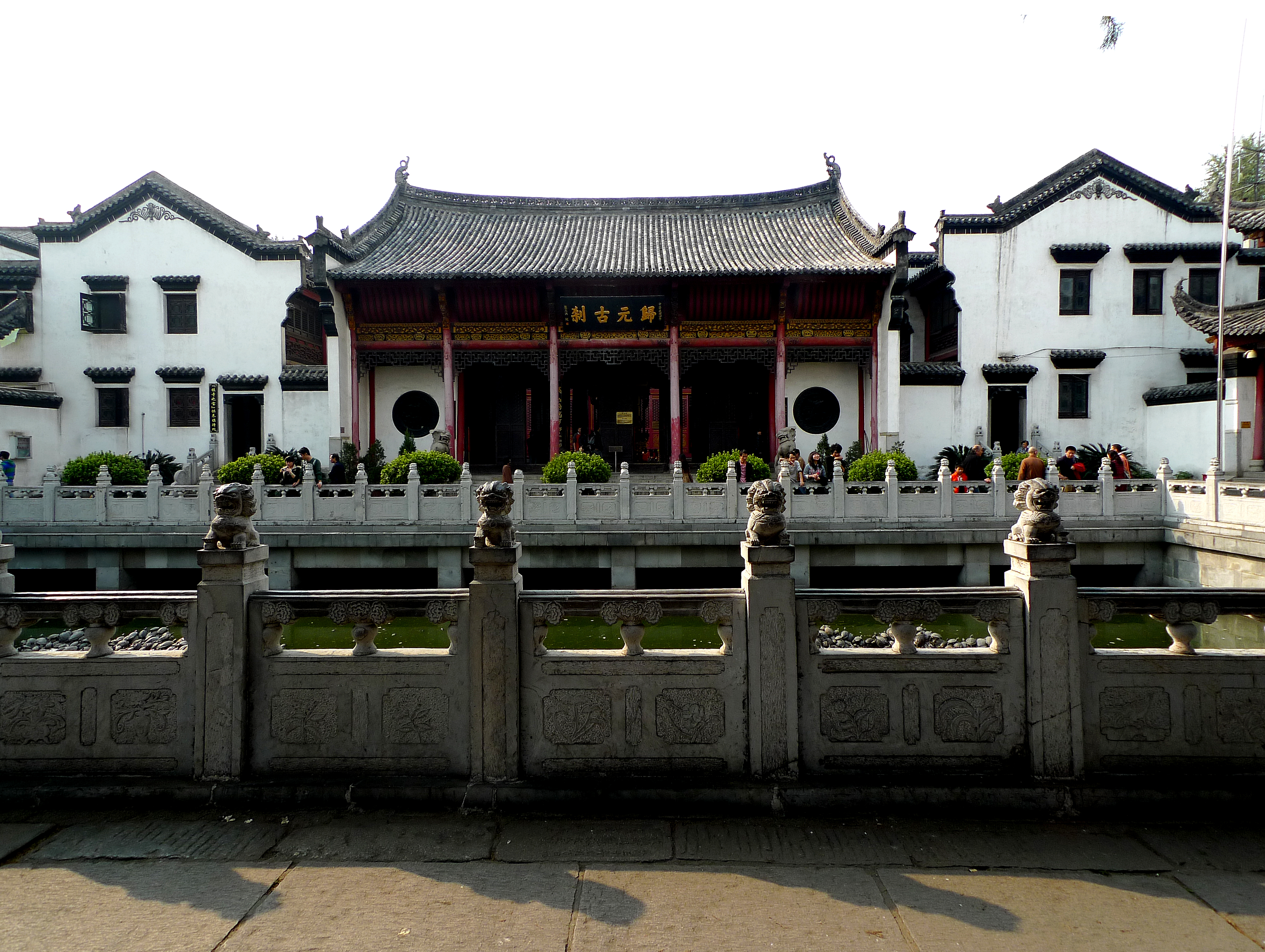
- Guiyuan Temple

- Location within Hubei Location within China

Religion
- Affiliation: Buddhism
- Sect: Chan Buddhism – Caodong school

Location
- Location: Hanyang District of Wuhan, Hubei, China
- Interactive map of Guiyuan Temple
- Coordinates: 30°32′53″N 114°15′17″E

Architecture
- Style: Chinese architecture
- Established: 1658

Guiyuan Temple (simplified Chinese: 归元寺; traditional Chinese: 歸元寺; pinyin: Guīyuán Sì) is a Buddhist temple located on Cuiwei Road in Hanyang District of Wuhan, Hubei, China.

It was built in the 15th year of Shunzhi period (1658) of the Qing dynasty (1644–1911), and has a land area of 4.67 acres (1.89 ha). The New Pavilion built in 1922 is the treasury of the temple.

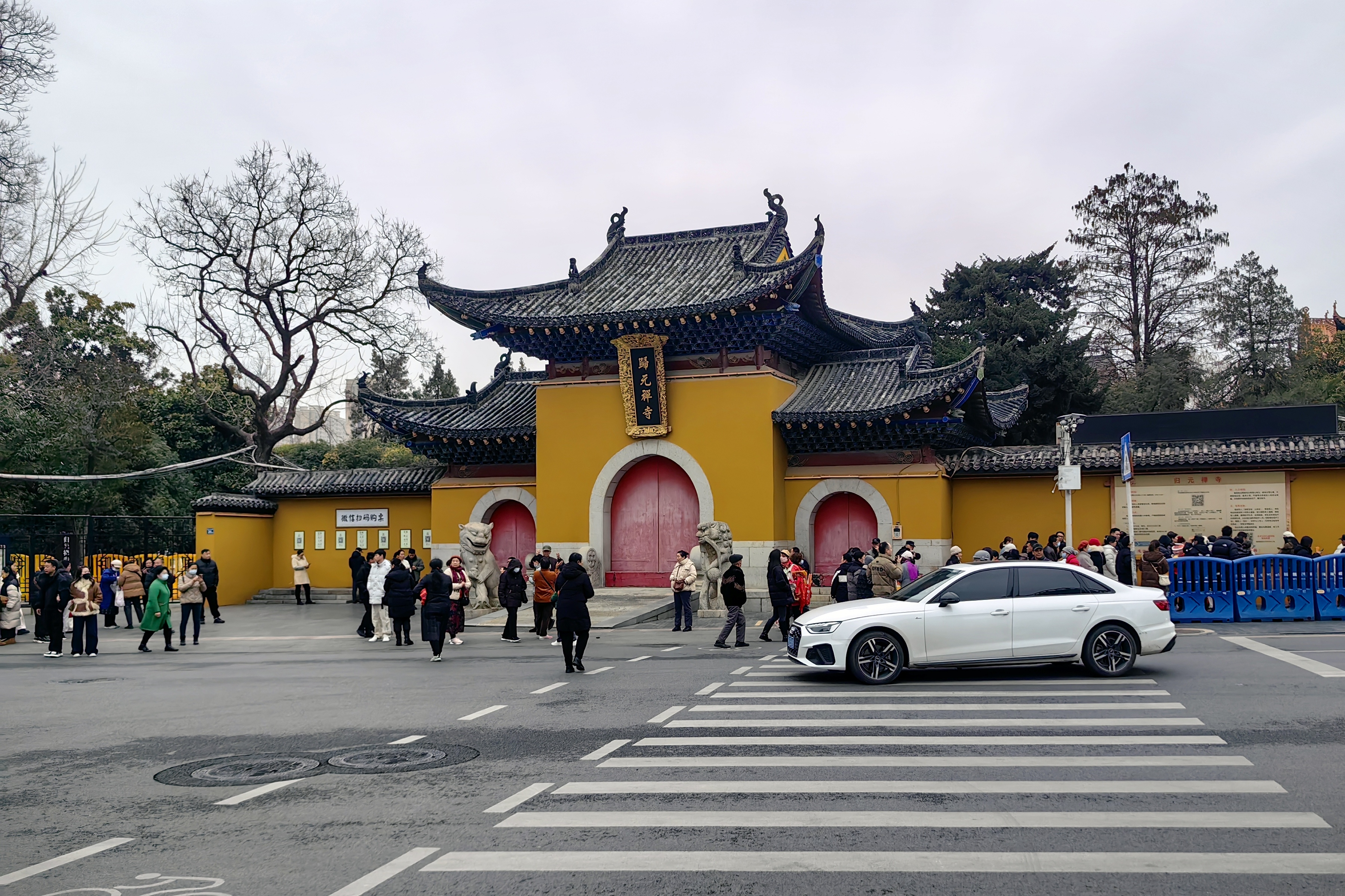
Entrance

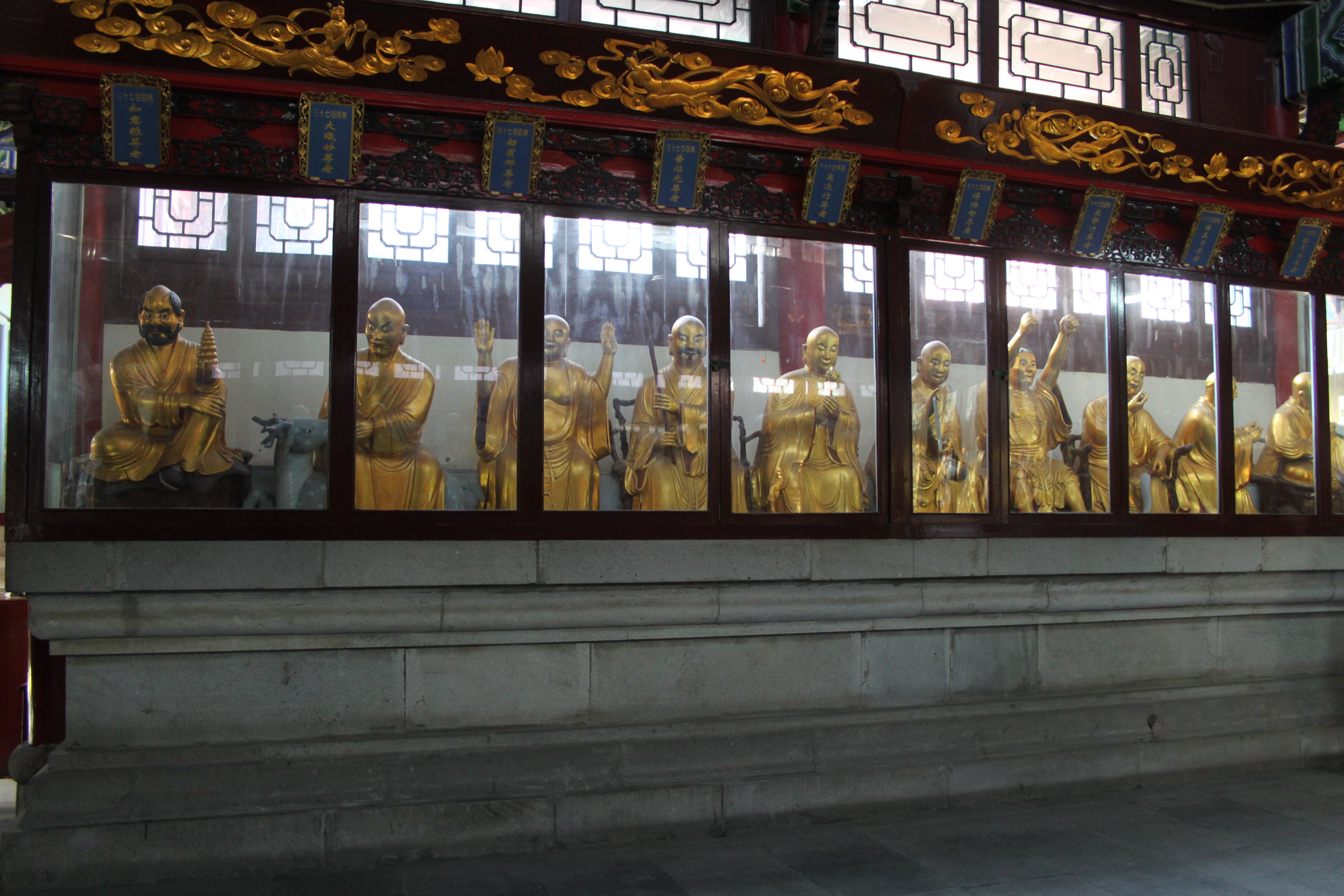
Some of the 500 Buddhas

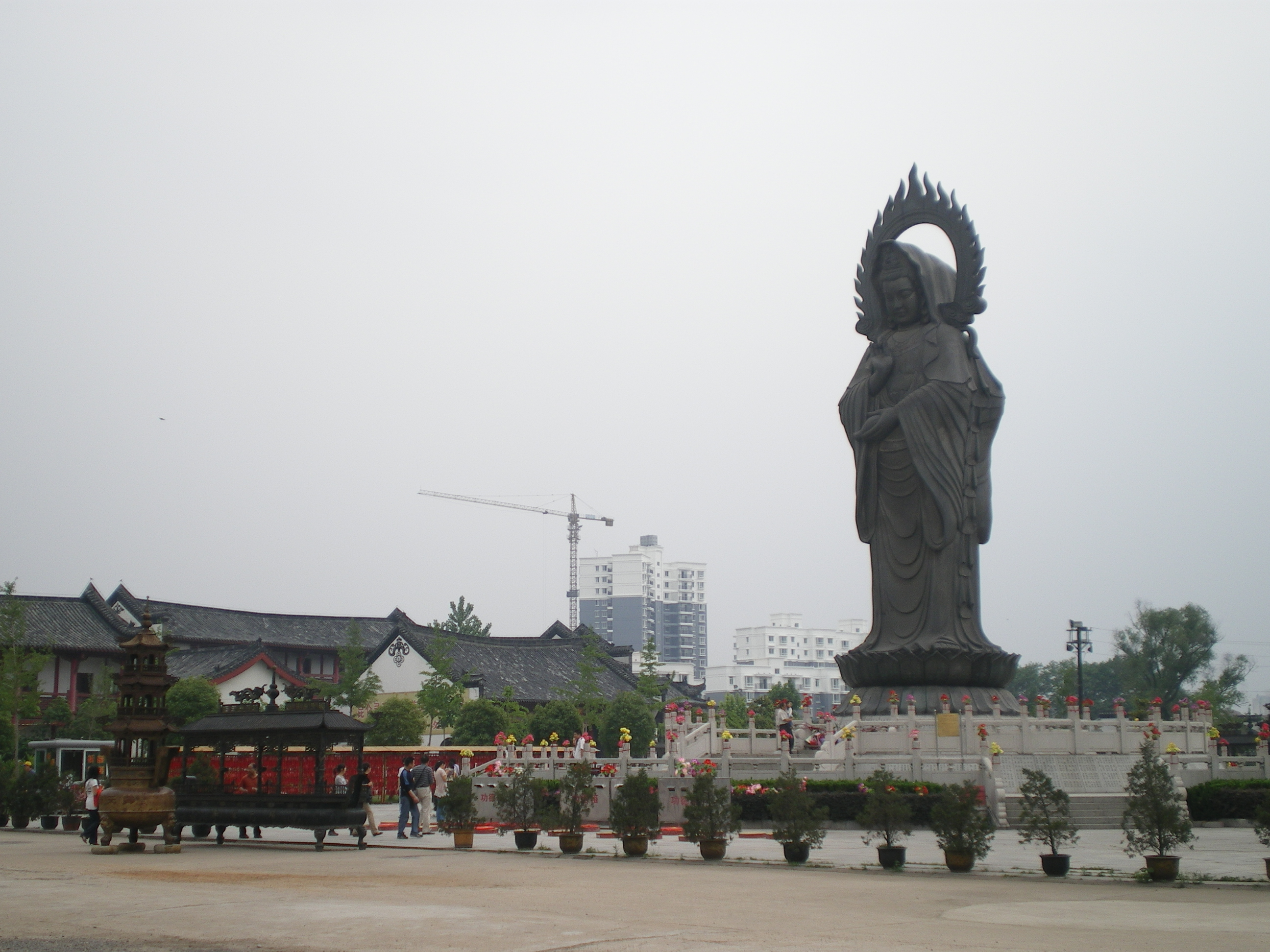
Giant statue of Guanyin

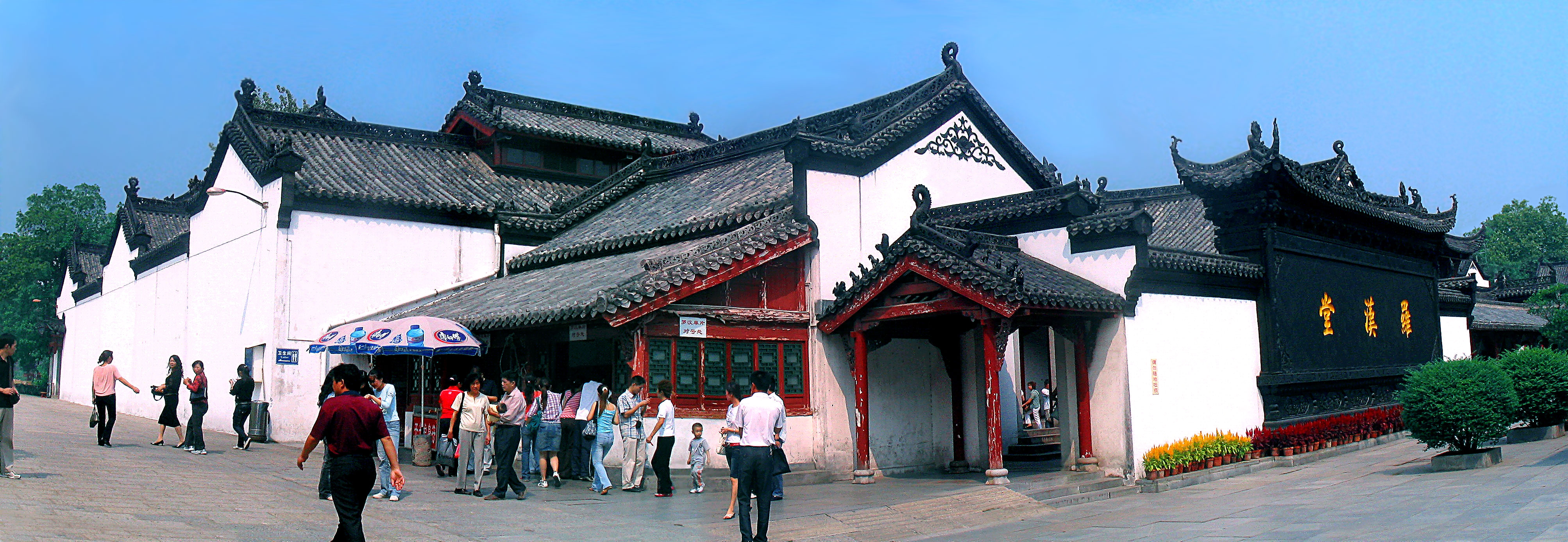
Luohan Hall
