= Wuhan French International School =

International school in Wuhan, China

Chinese name
- Simplified Chinese: 武汉法国国际学校
- Traditional Chinese: 武漢法國國際學校
Transcriptions
Standard Mandarin
- Hanyu Pinyin: Wǔhàn Fǎguó Guójì Xuéxiào

French name
- French: Ecole Française Internationale de Wuhan

Wuhan French International School (French: Ecole Française Internationale de Wuhan, EFIW; Chinese: 武汉法国国际学校) is a French international school in Wuhan, China. It is adjacent to Jianghan University, in Hanyang District. It directly teaches toute petite section through CM2, while it uses the distance education programme from the National Centre for Distance Education (CNED) until terminale S (final year of lycée or senior high school/sixth form college).

== History ==
It opened in September 2008. The French Consulate in Wuhan supported the school's opening. The current 30,000-square-metre (320,000 sq ft) campus opened in April 2014, with a capacity of 300 students.

== Student body ==
As of 2015 the school had 61 students: 43 in primary school and 18 in secondary school.
