= Line 16 (Wuhan Metro) =

Line of Wuhan Metro

- 16
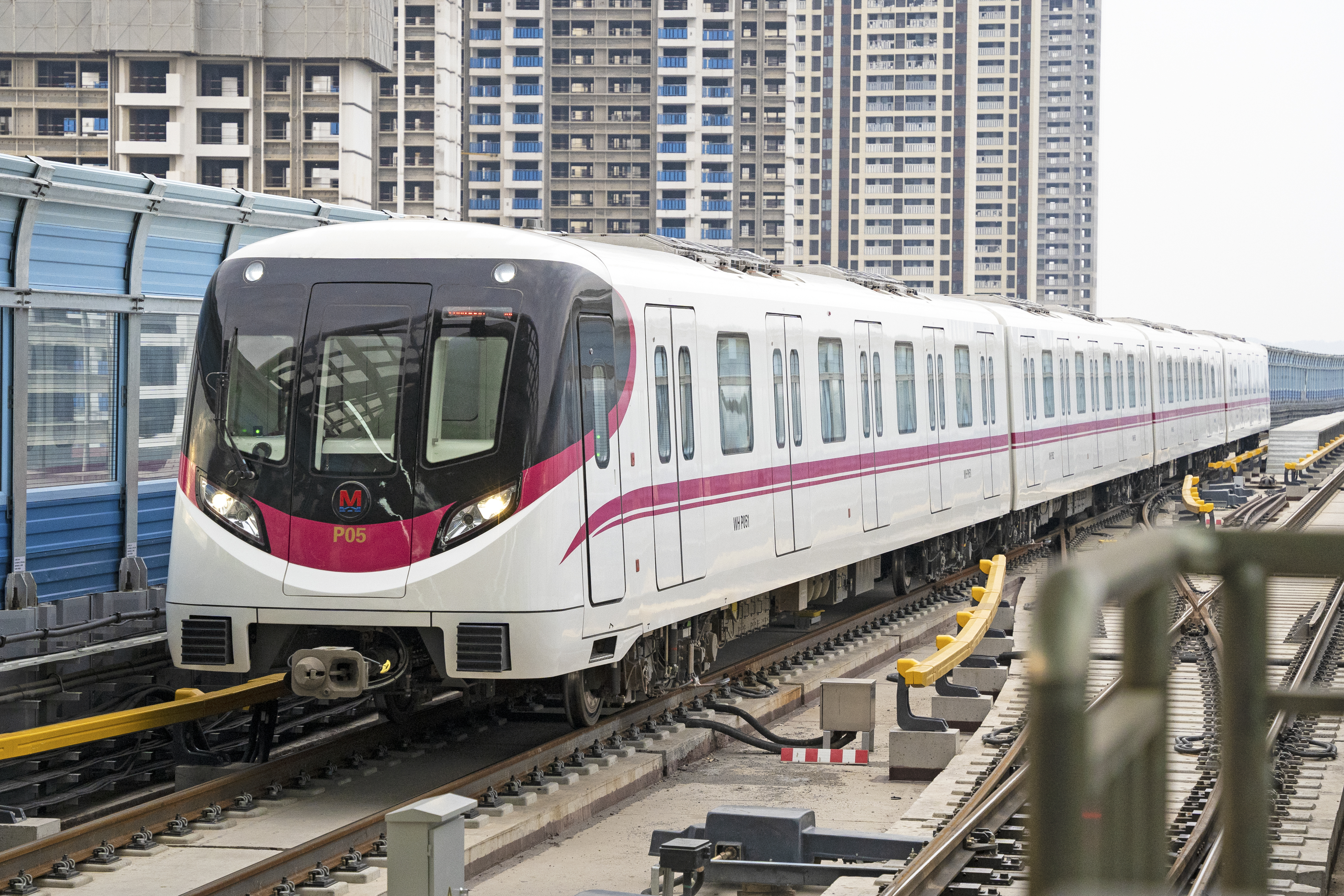

Overview
- Other name: Hannan line
- Status: Operational
- Owner: Wuhan
- Locale: Wuhan, Hubei, China
- Termini: South International Expo Center; Hannan General Airport
- Stations: 14

Service
- Type: Rapid transit
- System: Wuhan Metro
- Services: 1
- Operator: Wuhan Metro Group Co., Ltd.

History
- Opened: 26 December 2021; 4 years ago

Technical
- Line length: 36.5 km (22.7 mi) (Phase 1 & 2)
- Number of tracks: 2
- Character: Underground and elevated
- Track gauge: 1,435 mm (4 ft 8 1/2 in)
- Operating speed: 120 km/h (75 mph) (maximum)

Line 16 of Wuhan Metro (Chinese: 武汉轨道交通16号线) is a metro line in Wuhan, Hubei, China. It has a maximum speed of 120 kilometres per hour (75 mph). It runs from South International Expo Center station in Hanyang District to Hannan General Airport station in Hannan District.

== History ==
=== Phase 1 ===
Phase 1 of the line (from South International Expo Center to Zhoujiahe) has 7 underground stations and 5 elevated stations. Phase 1 of the line started operation on 26 December 2021.

=== Phase 2 ===
Phase 2 of the line is 4.22 km in length with 2 stations. The extension opened on 30 December 2022.

Segment	Commencement	Length	Station(s)	Name
South International Expo Center — Zhoujiahe	26 December 2021	32.3 km (20.1 mi)	12	Phase 1
Zhoujiahe — Hannan General Airport	30 December 2022	4.22 km (2.62 mi)	2	Phase 2

== Stations ==
Station name		Connections	Distance km		Location
English	Chinese	Connections	Distance km		Location
South International Expo Center	国博中心南	6 12	0	0	Hanyang
Laoguancun	老关村	6			Hanyang
South Taizihu	南太子湖				Caidian
Zhuankou	沌口				Caidian
Xiaojunshan	小军山				Caidian
Fenglin	枫林				Caidian
Dajunshan	大军山				Caidian
Guizihu	桂子湖				Hannan
Mayinghe	马影河				Hannan
Xiezihe	协子河				Hannan
Wanhu	湾湖				Hannan
Zhoujiahe	周家河				Hannan
Shamao	纱帽				Hannan
Hannan General Airport	通航机场	Wuhan Hannan			Hannan
