= Hanyang, Wuhan =

Hanyang 汉阳区
- District
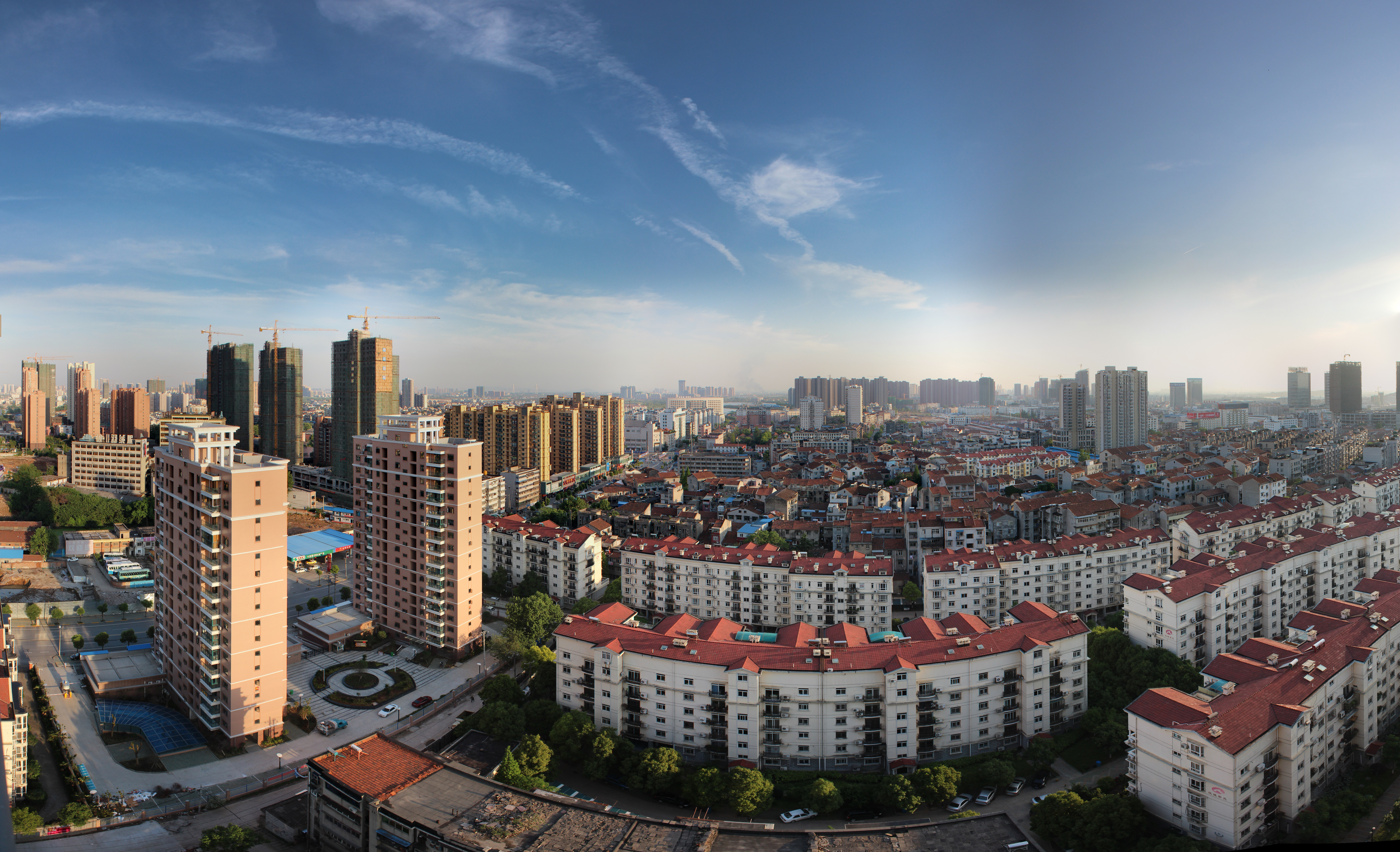
- View of Hanyang District
- Interactive map of Hanyang
- Location in Hubei
- Coordinates: 30°32′23″N 114°12′43″E
- Country: People's Republic of China
- Province: Hubei
- Sub-provincial city: Wuhan
- Township-level (4th) subdivisions: 13

Area
  - Total: 108.34 km^{2} (41.83 sq mi)

Population (2020)
  - Total: 837,263
  - Density: 7,728.1/km^{2} (20,016/sq mi)
- Time zone: UTC+8 (China Standard)
- Website: www.hanyang.gov.cn

Hanyang, Wuhan
- Traditional Chinese: 漢陽區
- Simplified Chinese: 汉阳区
Transcriptions
Standard Mandarin
- Hanyu Pinyin: Hànyáng Qū
- Bopomofo: ㄏㄢˋㄧㄤˊㄑㄩ

Hanyang District (Chinese: 汉阳区; pinyin: Hànyáng Qū) is one of 13 urban districts of the prefecture-level city of Wuhan, the capital of Hubei Province, China.

Currently, it is a district and stands between the Han River (right/southern bank) and the Yangtze River (left/northwestern bank), where the former drains into the latter. It is connected by bridges with its former sister cities, Hankou and Wuchang. Presently, on the left bank of the Yangtze, it borders the districts of Qiaokou to the north across the Han River, Jianghan to the northeast, Caidian to the southwest, and Dongxihu to the northwest; on the opposite bank it borders Wuchang and Hongshan. Guiyuan Temple is located in Hanyang.

The name "Hanyang" means "the Yang side of Han River", referring to the town's historic location on the north ("yang") bank of the Han River mouth. However, the lower Han River changed course to the north side of the town during Ming dynasty's Chenghua-era. The town, now on the south ("yin") side of the river, should have been renamed to "Hanyin" by naming convention, but the name "Hanyang" remained as it was well-established since the Sui dynasty. Administratively, the area forms Hanyang District of the modern Wuhan city, with an area of 108 square kilometers (42 sq mi) and a population of 510,000.

The Hanyang Arsenal is known for its production of the so-called "Hanyang rifle" - an indigenous Asian copy of the German Model 1888 Commission Rifle, which was heavily used in World War II, as well as in the Korean War and Vietnam War.

== Geography ==
=== Administrative divisions ===
As of 2016, Hanyang District administers eleven subdistricts, one economic development zone and one administrative committee:

#	Name	Chinese (S)	Hanyu Pinyin	English Meaning	Population (2010)	Area (km^{2})
Subdistricts
1	Qingchuan Subdistrict	晴川街道	Qíngchuān Jiēdào	Clear Creek	17,138	1.64
2	Longyang Subdistrict	龙阳街道	Lóngyáng Jiēdào	Longyang		
3	Jianqiao Subdistrict	建桥街道	Jiànqiáo Jiēdào	Bridge Construction	46,960	1.41
4	Yingwu Subdistrict	鹦鹉街道	Yīngwǔ Jiēdào	Parrot	51,945	2.52
5	Zhoutou Subdistrict	洲头街道	Zhōutóu Jiēdào	Islet	38,888	4.05
6	Sixin Subdistrict	四新街道	Sìxīn Jiēdào	Four New		
7	Wulidun Subdistrict	五里墩街道	Wǔlǐdūn Jiēdào	Five Li Dun	87,346	5.63
8	Qinduankou Subdistrict	琴断口街道	Qínduànkǒu Jiēdào	Broken Qin Mouth	66,908	3.39
9	Jianghan'erqiao Subdistrict	江汉二桥街道	Jiānghàn'èrqiáo Jiēdào	Jianghan Second Bridge	76,001	3.88
10	Yongfeng Subdistrict	永丰街道	Yǒngfēng Jiēdào	Ever-abundant	106,482	33.70
11	Jiangdi Subdistrict	江堤街道	Jiāngdī Jiēdào	River Dyke	24,496	16.93
former	Cuiwei Subdistrict	翠微街道	Cuìwēi Jiēdào	Green Hills	44,529	1.46
former	Yuehu Subdistrict	月湖街道	Yuèhú Jiēdào	Moon Lake	20,944	4.86
Other Areas
12	Hanyang Economic Development Area	汉阳经济开发区	Hànyáng Jīngjì Fāzhǎn Qū	Hanyang Economic Development Area		
13	Sixin Area Administrative Committee	四新地区管委会	Sìxīn Dìqū Guǎnwěihuì	Four New	2,461	8.93

== Education ==
Colleges and universities:

- Jianghan University

Primary and secondary schools:

- Wuhan French International School

== Gallery ==
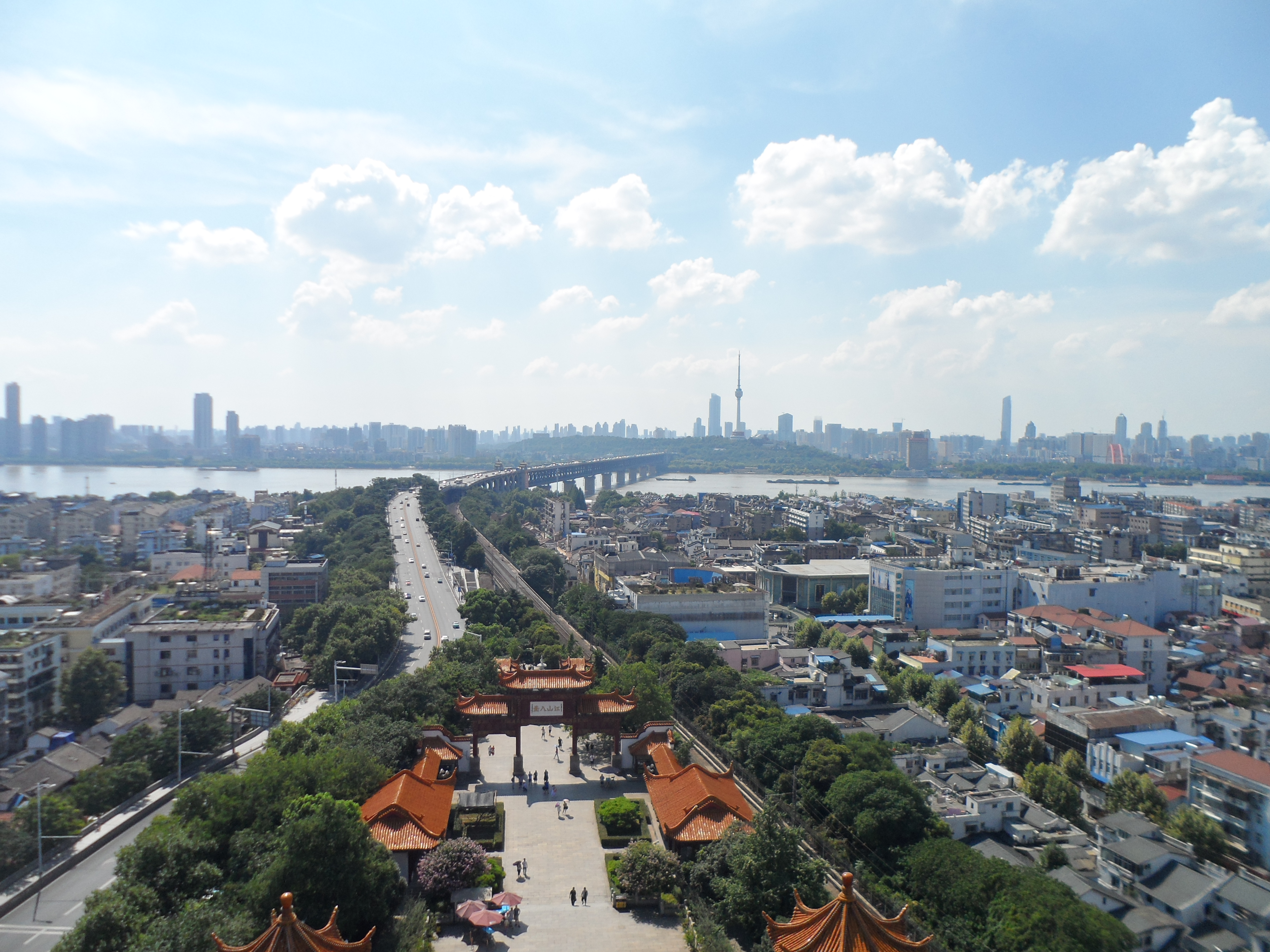
Wuchang (foreground) and Hanyang (background) seen from the Yellow Crane Tower

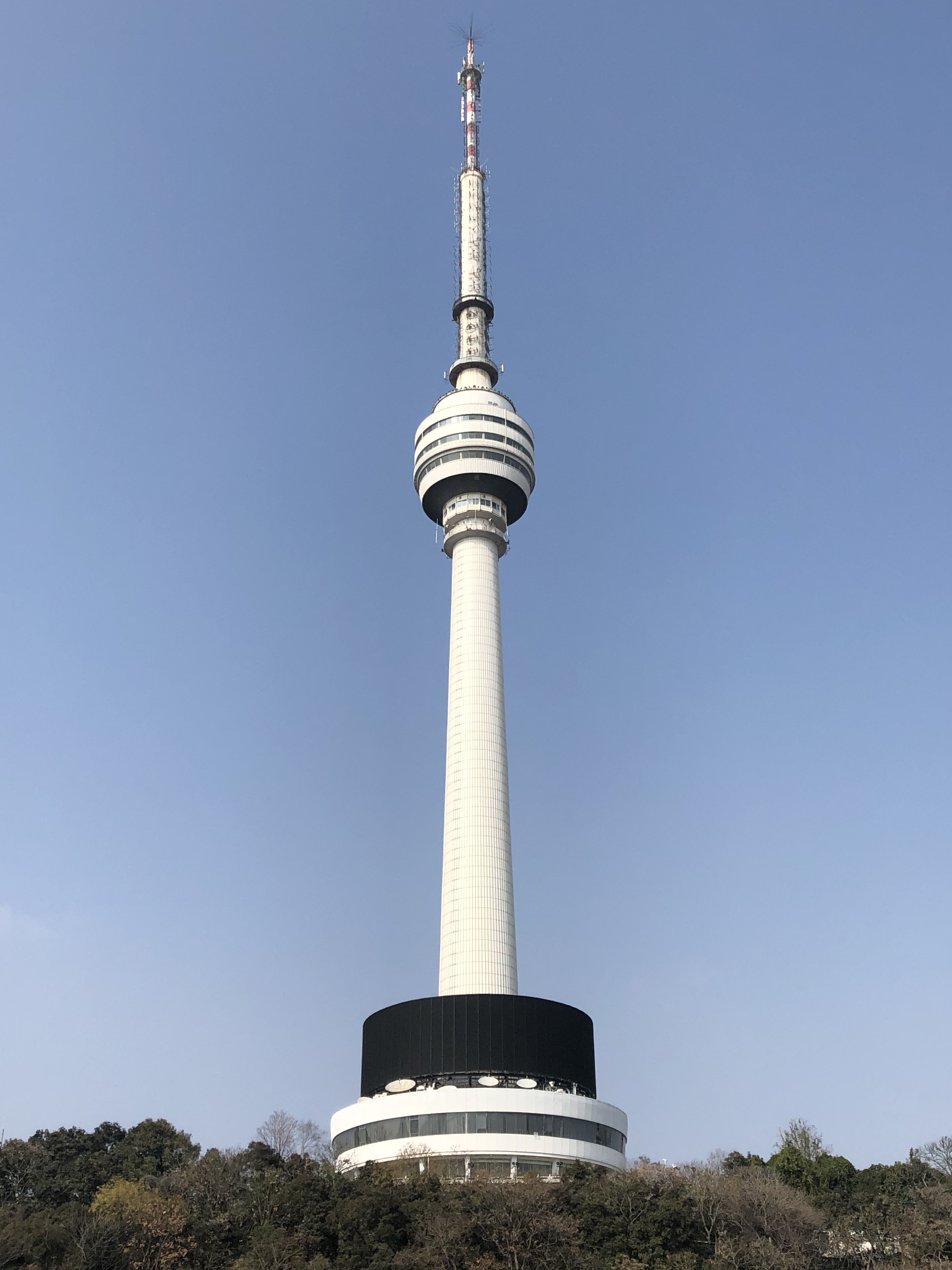
Tortoise Mountain TV Tower

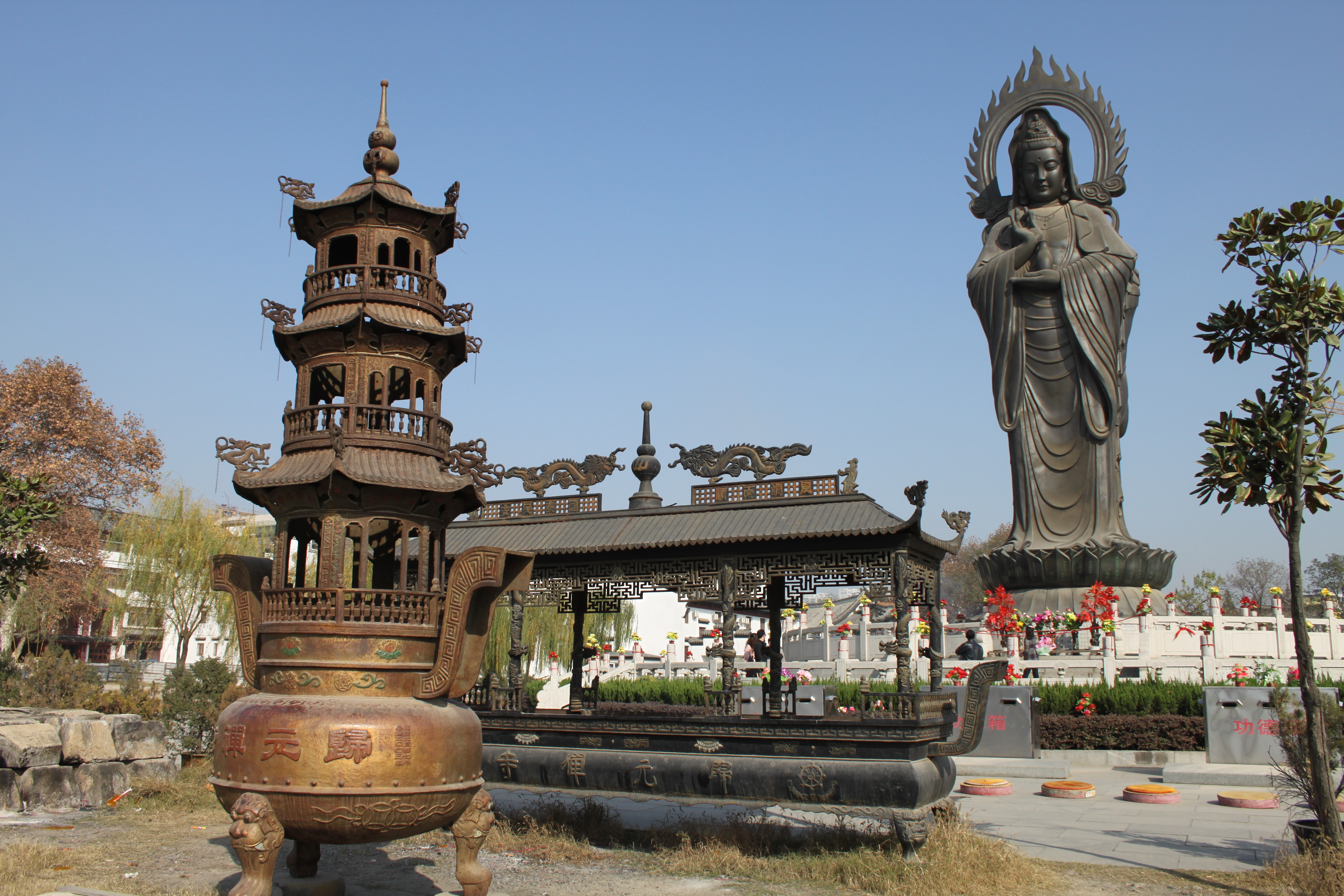
Guiyuan Temple

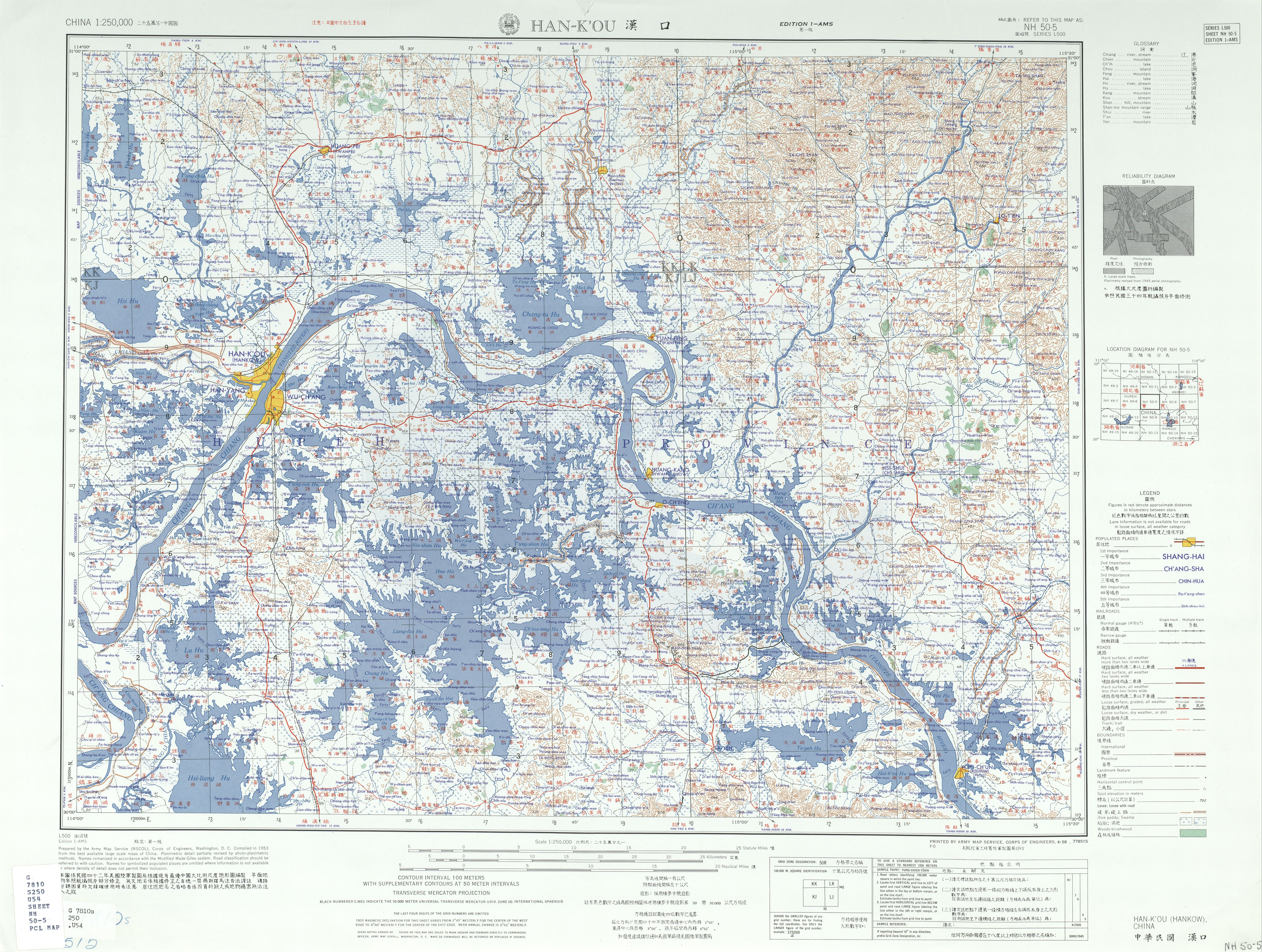
Map including Hanyang (labeled as HAN-YANG 漢陽) (1953)
